

Q

 Q: (1982 & 2011)
 Q&A (1990)
 Q-Bec My Love (1970)
 Q Planes (1939)
Q.R.R (Quien resulte responsable) (1970)

Qa–Qo

 Qafqaz və Merkuri cəmiyyətinin paroxodunun limandan yola düşməsi (1898)
 Qahar (1997)
 Qaid (1975)
 Qaidi: (1940, 1957, 1984 & 1986)
 Qaidi Band (2017)
 Qaidi No. 911 (1959)
 Qamaran wa Zaytouna (2001)
 Qarib Qarib Singlle (2017)
 Qasam (1993)
 Qasam Se Qasam Se (2012)
 Qatil (1988)
 Qatl (1986)
 Qatil Aur Ashiq (1986)
 Qayamat (1983)
 Qayamat Se Qayamat Tak (1998)
 Qayamat – A Love Triangle In Afghanistan (2003)
 Qayamat: City Under Threat (2003)
 Qerq (2007)
 Qeysar (1969)
 Qila (1998)
 Qimmit, a Clash of Two Truths (2010)
 Qing Chang Ru Zhan Chang (1957)
 Qismat (2018)
 Qissa (2013)
 Qissa Panjab (2015)
 Qissa-e Parsi: The Parsi Story (2014)
 Qiu Jin (1983)
 Qivitoq (1956)
 Qortimet e vjeshtës (1982)

Qu

 Qu Yuan (1977)
 Qu'est-ce qu'on attend pour être heureux! (1982)

Qua

 Qua la mano (1980)
 The Quack (1982)
 Quack Shot (1954)
 Quackser Fortune Has a Cousin in the Bronx (1970)
 Quacker Tracker (1967)
 Quackodile Tears (1962)
 Quad (2013) 
 Quad God (2000)
 Quadrille: (1938, 1997 & 1999)
 Quadrophenia (1979)
 Quai des Orfèvres (1947)
 The Quail Hunt (1935)
 Quake (1992 TV)
 The Quake (2018)
 The Quakeress (1913)
 A Qualcuna Piace Calvo (1959)
 The Qualified Adventurer (1925)
 Quality of Life (2004)
 The Quality of Mercy (1994)
 Quality Street: (1927 & 1937)
 Quality Time (2017)
 Qualquer Gato Vira-Lata (2011)
 Qualunquemente (2011)
 Quand j'avais cinq ans je m'ai tué (1994)
 Quand on crie au loup (2019)
 Quando c'era lui... caro lei! (1978)
 Quando la coppia scoppia (1981)
 Quando Elas Querem (1925)
 Quando Eu Era Vivo (2014)
 Quanto è bello lu murire acciso (1976)
 Quanto sei bella Roma (1959)
 Quantrill's Raiders (1958)
 Quantum Hoops (2007)
 Quantum Love (2014)
 Quantum Quest: A Cassini Space Odyssey (2010)
 Quantum of Solace (2008)
 Quarantine: (1923, 1983, 2008 & 2021)
 Quarantine 2: Terminal (2011)
 Quarantine L.A. (2013)
 Quarantined (1970)
 The Quarrel (1991)
 The Quarry: (1998 & 2020)
 Quarta Divisão (2013)
 The Quarterback: (1926 & 1940)
 Quarterback Princess (1981)
 Quartet: (1948, 1981 & 2012)
 Quartet of Five (1949)                                                                             
 Quartier V.I.P. (2005)
 Quartiere (1987)
 Quasi at the Quackadero (1975)
 Quasimodo d'El Paris (1999)
 Quatermass 2 (1957)
 The Quatermass Experiment (2005 TV)
 Quatermass and the Pit (1967)
 The Quatermass Xperiment (1955)
 Quatre-vingt-treize (1920)
 Quattro bravi ragazzi (1993)
 Quax in Africa (1947)
 Quax the Crash Pilot (1941)
 Quay (2015)

Que

 Que Dios me perdone (1948)
 Que la barque se brise, que la jonque s'entrouvre (2001)
 Que me toquen las golondrinas (1957)
 Que Sera (2014)
 Que sera, sera (2002)
 Que viva la lucha (2007)
 Quebec (1951)
 Quebec – Path of Conquest (1942)
 Queberc: (1951 & 2007)
 Quebracho (1974)
 A Queda (1976)
 The Queen's Corgi (2019)
 Queen: (2014 & 2018)
 The Queen: (1968, 2006 & 2012)
 Queen of the Amazons (1947)
 Queen of the Arena (1952)
 The Queen in Australia (1954)
 Queen of Babylon (1954)
 The Queen of the Baths (1926)
 Queen Bee (1955)
 Queen Bees (2021)
 The Queen of Biarritz (1934)
 Queen of Blood: (1966 & 2014)
 Queen of the Boulevards (1927)
 Queen of Broadway (1942)
 Queen of Burlesque (1946)
 Queen of Cactus Cove (2005)
 Queen of Carthage (2014)
 A Queen for Caesar (1962)
 Queen of the Chantecler (1962)
 Queen Christina (1933)
 Queen of Clubs (1966)
 Queen and Country (2014)
 Queen of the Damned (2002)
 Queen for a Day (1951)
 Queen of the Desert (2015)
 Queen Draga (1920)
 Queen of Earth (2015)
 Queen of Fashion (1929)
 The Queen of Fear (2018)
 Queen of the Gas Station (1963)
 Queen of Hearts: (1936, 1989 & 2019)
 The Queen of Hearts (2009)
 Queen High (1930)
 Queen of Housewives (2009)
 The Queen and I: (2008 & 2018)
 The Queen of Ireland (2015)
 A Queen Is Crowned (1953)
 The Queen Is in the Factory (2008)
 Queen of Katwe (2016)
 Queen Kelly (1929)
 Queen Kong (1976)
 The Queen of the Landstrasse (1948)
 Queen Louise: (1927 & 1957)
 Queen Margot: (1954 & 1994)
 Queen Mimi (2015)
 Queen of the Mob (1940)
 Queen of Montreuil (2012)
 Queen of the Morning Calm (2019)
 The Queen Mother (1916)
 The Queen of Moulin Rouge (1926)
 Queen of the Mountain (2005)
 Queen of the Mountains (2014)
 The Queen of Navarre (1942)
 Queen of the Night: (1931 German, 1931 Italian, 1951, 2001 & 2013)
 The Queen of the Night (1994)
 Queen of the Night Clubs (1929)
 Queen o'Diamonds (1926)
 Queen of Outer Space (1958)
 Queen of the Pirates (1960)
 Queen to Play (2009)
 Queen of Reversals (2010)
 Queen of the Road (1984)
 Queen Sacrifice (1988)
 Queen of the Scala (1937)
 Queen of the Sea (1918)
 Queen of the Seas (1961)
 The Queen of Sheba: (1921 & 1952)
 The Queen of Sheba's Pearls (2004)
 Queen Sized (2008)
 Queen & Slim (2019)
 The Queen of Spades: (1910, 1916, 1927, 1949, 1960, 1982 & 2016)
 The Queen of Spain (2016)
 The Queen of Sparta (1931)
 Queen of Sports (1934)
 Queen of the Stardust Ballroom (1975)
 The Queen of the Stock Exchange (1918)
 Queen of the Streets (1921)
 Queen of the Sun (2010)
 Queen of the Tabarin Club (1960)
 Queen of Temple Street (1990)
 The Queen of Versailles (2012)
 The Queen Was in the Parlour (1927)
 The Queen of Whitechapel (1922)
 Queen X (1917)
 Queen of the Yukon (1940)
 Queenie of Hollywood (1931)
 Queenpins (2021)
 Queens (2005)
 The Queens (2015)
 The Queens of Comedy (2001)
 Queens of Langkasuka (2008)
 Queens Logic (1991)
 Queensland (1976)
 The Queen's Affair (1934)
 The Queen's Corgi (2019)
 Queen's Evidence (1919)
 The Queen's Flower (1946) 
 The Queen's Flower Girl (1940)
 The Queen's Guards (1961)
 The Queen's Love Letter (1916)
 The Queen's Necklace: (1929 & 1946)
 A Queen's Ransom (1976)
 The Queen's Secretary (1916)
 The Queen's Sister (2005)
 Queer Boys and Girls on the Shinkansen (or ... on the Bullet Train) (2004)
 Queer Cargo (1938)
 Queer China (2008)
 Queer Duck: The Movie (2006)
 Queer Hutterite (2016)
 Queer Japan (2019)
 Queercore: How to Punk a Revolution (2017)
 Quel fantasma di mio marito (1950)
 Quel movimento che mi piace tanto (1977)
 Quelle drôle de gosse! (1935)
 Quelli che soffrono per voi (1951)
 Quem Matou Pixote? (1996)
 Quemar las Naves (2007)
 Querelle (1982)
 Quest: (1996, 2006 & 2017)
 The Quest (1996)
 Quest for Camelot (1998)
 Quest for Fire (1981)
 The Quest for Freedom (1992)
 Quest for Love: (1971 & 1988)
 The Quest of Life (1916)
 Quest for Zhu (2011)
 Quest for the Lost City (1955)
 Quest for the Mighty Sword (1990)
 Quest of the Delta Knights (1993)
 Questa volta parliamo di uomini (1965) 
 Questi giorni (2016)
 Questi pazzi, pazzi italiani (1965)
 Question 7 (1961)
 A Question of Adultery (1958)
 Question in Details (2010)
 A Question of Faith (2017)
 A Question of the Heart (2009)
 A Question of Honor: (1915 & 1922)
 A Question of Honour (1965)
 A Question of Silence (1982)
 A Question of Taste (2000)
 A Question of Trust (1920)
 Questions à la terre natale (2006)
 Questo amore ai confini del mondo (1960)
 Questo e Quello (1983)
 Questo pazzo, pazzo mondo della canzone (1965)
 The Questor Tapes (1974)
 Quetta: A City of Forgotten Dreams (2016)

Qui

 Qui c'est les plus forts? (2015)
 Qui comincia l'avventura (1975)
 Quick: (1932 & 2011)
 Quick Change: (1990 & 2013)
 The Quick and the Dead: (1963, 1987 & 1995)
 Quick Gun Murugun (2009)
 Quick Millions: (1931 & 1939)
 Quick Money (1937)
 Quick Pick (2006)
 Quick Trigger Lee (1931)
 Quick Triggers (1928)
 The Quick and the Undead (2006)
 Quick, Before It Melts (1964)
 Quick, Let's Get Married (1964)
 Quicker'n a Wink (1940)
 Quickie Express (2007)
 Quicksand: (1918, 1950, 2002 & 2003)
 Quicksand: No Escape (1992)
 Quicksands: (1913 & 1923)
 Quicksilver (1986)
 Quicksilver Highway (1997)
 Quid Pro Quo (2008)
 Quiéreme porque me muero (1953)
 Quiero llenarme de ti (1969)
 Quiero ser (I want to be...) (2000)
 The Quiet (2005)
 The Quiet American: (1958 & 2002)
 Quiet Bliss (2014)
 Quiet City (2007)
 Quiet Chaos (2008)
 Quiet Comes the Dawn (2019)
 Quiet Cool (1986)
 A Quiet Day in Belfast (1974)
 Quiet Days in August (1991)
 Quiet Days in Clichy: (1970 & 1990)
 Quiet Days in Hollywood (1997)
 A Quiet Dream (2016)
 The Quiet Duel (1949)
 The Quiet Earth (1985)
 The Quiet Family (1998)
 The Quiet Girl (2022)
 The Quiet Gun (1957)
 The Quiet Hour (2014)
 Quiet Killer (1992)
 Quiet Killing (2018)
 A Quiet Life (2010)
 A Quiet Little Marriage (2008)
 A Quiet Little Wedding (1913)
 The Quiet Man (1952)
 Quiet Night In (2005)
 Quiet Nights of Blood and Pain (2009)
 The Quiet Ones: (2010 & 2014)
 A Quiet Passion (2016)
 A Quiet Place series:
 A Quiet Place (2018)
 A Quiet Place Part II (2020)
 A Quiet Place: Day One (2024)
 A Quiet Place in the Country (1968)
 A Quiet Place to Kill (1970)
 Quiet Please, Murder (1942)
 Quiet Riot - Well Now You're Here (2015)
 The Quiet Room (1996)
 The Quiet Storm (2007)
 A Quiet Street (1922)
 Quiet Wedding (1941)
 A Quiet Week in the House (1969)
 Quiet Weekend (1946)
 Quiet Zone (2015)
 Quigley (2003)
 Quigley Down Under (1990)
 Quill (2004)
 The Quiller Memorandum (1966)
 Quills (2000)
 Quilombo (1984)
 Quinceañera (2006)
 La Quinceañera (2007)
 Quincy (2018)
 Quincy Adams Sawyer (1922)
 Quincy's Quest (1979)
 Quinneys: (1919 & 1927)
 Quintet (1979)
 Quints (2000 TV)
 Quisiera Ser Hombre (1988)
 Quit Staring at My Plate (2016)
 Quitters (2015)
 Quitting (2001)
 Quiz Show (1994)

Quo-Qur

 Quo Vadis: (1913, 1924, 1951 & 2001)
 Quo Vadis, Aida? (2020)
 Quo Vadis, Baby? (2005)
 Quo Vado? (2016)
 Quod Erat Demonstrandum (2013)
 Quota (2020)
 Qurbaani (2000)
 Qurbani (1980)
 Qurbani Jatt Di (1990)
 Qurbani Rang Layegi (1991)

R

 R (2010)
 R100 (2013)
 R2B: Return to Base (2012)
 R-Point (2004)
 R... Rajkumar (2013)
REC series:
 REC (2007)
 REC 2 (2009)
 REC 3: Genesis (2012)
 REC 4: Apocalypse (2014)
 RFK (2002)
 RFK Must Die (2007)
 R.I.P.D. (2013)
 RK Nagar (2019)
 RKO 281 (1999)
 The R.M. (2003)
 R.O.T.O.R. (1989)
 RPM (1998)
 R. P. M. (1970)
 RR (2007)
 RRR (2022)
 RSVP (1991)
 R.S.V.P.: (1984 & 2002)
 RV (2006)
 RV: Resurrected Victims (2017)

Ra

 Ra: (1972 & 2014)
 Ra Choi (2006)
 Ra Daniel Dawal Migel 3 (2004)
 Ra.One (2011)
 Ra Ra... Krishnayya (2014)

Raa

 Raa (2001)
 Raa Raa: (2011 & 2018)
 Raabta (2017)
 Raadha Aur Seeta (1979)
 Raag (2014)
 Raag Desh (2017)
 Raaga (2017)
 Raaga Deepam (1982)
 Raagam (1975)
 Raagam Thaanam Pallavi (1980)
 Raagangal Maaruvathillai (1983)
 Raaj (2011)
 Raaj Mahal (1982)
 Raaj the Showman (2009)
 Raaj Tilak (1984)
 Raaja (1975)
 Raaja Raajathan (1989)
 Raajakumara (2017)
 Raajaveedhi (1979)
 Raajavembaala (1984)
 Raajjiyam (2002)
 Raajneeti (2010)
 Raakh: (1989, 2010 & 2016)
 Raakhandaar (2014)
 Raakhi Ki Saugandh (1979)
 Raakilipattu (2007)
 Raakuyil (1973)
 Raam: (2005, 2006 & 2009)
 Raama Raavanan (2010)
 Raamanam (2009)
 Raambo 2 (2018)
 Raamdhenu (2011)
 Raampur Ka Lakshman (1972)
 Raani Samyuktha (1962)
 Raanjhanaa (2013)
 Raasaiyya (1995)
 Raasaleela (1975)
 Raasave Unnai Nambi (1988)
 Raashtram (2006)
 Raasi (1997)
 Raasta: (2003 & 2017)
 Raaste Kaa Patthar (1972)
 Raaste Pyar Ke (1982)
 Raasukutti (1992)
 Raat (1992)
 Raat Aur Din (1967)
 Raat Bhar (2014)
 Raat Bhore (1955)
 Raat Gayi, Baat Gayi? (2009)
 Raat Ke Rahi (1959)
 Raatchasi (2019)
 Raathrikal Ninakku Vendi (1979)
 Raathriyile Yaathrakkaar (1976)
 Raaton Ka Raja (1970)
 Raattinam (2012)
 Raavan: (1984 & 2010)
 Raavanan (2010)
 Raavanaprabhu (2001)
 Raaz: (1967, 1981 & 2002)
 Raaz 3D (2012)
 Raaz: Reboot (2016)
 Raaz: The Mystery Continues (2009)
 Raazi (2018)

Rab

 Rab Ne Bana Di Jodi (2008)
 Rabat (2011)
 Rabb Da Radio (2017)
 Rabb Da Radio 2 (2019)
 Rabba Main Kya Karoon (2013)
 The Rabbi's Cat (2011)
 Rabbit à la Berlin (2009)
 Rabbit Every Monday (1951)
 Rabbit Fever (2009)
 Rabbit Fire (1951)
 Rabbit Hero (2015)
 Rabbit Hole (2011)
 Rabbit Hood (1949)
 The Rabbit Is Me (1965)
 The Rabbit Man (1990)
 Rabbit Punch (1948)
 Rabbit Rampage (1955)
 Rabbit Romeo (1957)
 Rabbit Seasoning (1952)
 Rabbit of Seville (1950)
 Rabbit Test (1978)
 Rabbit Transit (1947)
 The Rabbit Trap (1959)
 Rabbit Without Ears (2007)
 Rabbit Without Ears 2 (2009)
 Rabbit-Proof Fence (2002)
 Rabbit, Run (1970)
 Rabbit's Feat (1960)
 Rabbit's Kin (1952)
 Rabbit's Moon (1950)
 Rabbits (2002)
 Rabbitson Crusoe (1956)
 Rabhasa (2014)
 Rabid: (1977 & 2019)
 Rabid Dogs: (1974 & 2015)
 Rabid Grannies (1988)
 Rabid Rider (2010)
 Rabies: (1958 & 2010)
 Rabin, the Last Day (2015)
 Rabindranath Tagore (1961)
 Raboliot (1946)

Rac

 Race: (2007, 2011, 2013 & 2016)
 The Race: (1916 & 2002)
 Race series:
 Race (2008)
 Race 2 (2013)
 Race 3 (2018)
 Race for the Bomb (1987)
 Race with the Devil (1975)
 Race to Freedom: Um Bok Dong (2019)
 Race for Glory (1989)
 Race Gurram (2014)
 Race to Nowhere (2009)
 Race Riot (1929)
 The Race for Space (1959)
 Race to Space (2002)
 Race Street (1948)
 Race the Sun (1996)
 The Race to the Throne (1919)
 Race to Witch Mountain (2009)
 Race for the Yankee Zephyr (1981)
 Race for Your Life, Charlie Brown (1977)
 Racek má zpoždění (1950)
 Racer and the Jailbird (2017)
 Racetime (2018)
 Racetrack (1933)
 Racha (2012)
 Rachana (1983)
 Rachel (2009)
 Rachel Carson (2017)
 The Rachel Divide (2018)
 Rachel Getting Married (2008)
 Rachel and the Stranger (1948)
 Rachel, Rachel (1968)
 Racing Blood (1954)
 Racing Dreams (2009)
 Racing Hearts (1923)
 Racing Lady (1937)
 Racing Luck: (1935, 1941 & 1948)
 Racing with the Moon (1984)
 Racing Romance: (1926 & 1937)
 The Racing Scene (1969)
 Racing Stripes (2005)
 Racing for Time (2008)
 Racing Youth (1932)
 The Racket: (1928 & 1951)
 Racket Busters (1938)
 Racket Girls (1951)
 The Racketeer (1929)
 Racketeer Rabbit (1946)
 Rackety Rax (1932)
 Racquet (1979)

Rad–Raf

 Rad (1986)
 Radar Station (1953)
 Le Radeau de la Méduse (1994)
 Radha (2017)
 Radha Enna Pennkutti (1979)
 Radha Gopalam (2005)
 Radha Ka Sangam (1992)
 Radha Kalyanam: (1935 & 1981)
 Radha Krishna (1933)
 Radha Madhavam (1990)
 Radha My Darling (1982)
 Radha Ramana (1943)
 Radhan Ganda (2013)
 Radhe: (2017, 2021 & TBD)
 Radiance: (1998 & 2017)
 Radiance: The Experience of Light (1978)
 Radiant City (2006)
 Radiator (2014)
 Radical Act (1995)
 Radical Harmonies (2002)
 Radin! (2016)
 Radio: (2003, 2009 & 2013)
 Radio Bar (1936)
 Radio Bikini (1988)
 Radio Bugs (1944)
 Radio Cab Murder (1954)
 Radio Cape Cod (2008)
 Radio City Revels (1938)
 Radio Corazon (2007)
 Radio Day (2008)
 Radio Days (1987)
 Radio Dayz (2008)
 Radio Dreams (2016)
 Radio Flyer (1992)
 Radio Free Albemuth (2010)
 Radio Inside (1994)
 Radio Lover (1936)
 Radio Magic (1927)
 Radio On (1979)
 Radio Parade of 1935 (1934)
 Radio Patrol (1932)
 Radio Pirates (1935)
 Radio Rebel (2012)
 Radio Rhythm (1931)
 Radio Star (2006)
 Radio Stars on Parade (1945)
 Radio Stories (1955)
 Radio Surprises (1940)
 Radioactive (2019)
 Radioactive Dreams (1985)
 Radioland Murders (1994)
 Radius (2017)
 Raees: (1976 & 2017)
 Raf (2019)
 Rafaël (2018)
 Rafea: Solar Mama (2012)
 Rafferty (1980)
 Rafferty and the Gold Dust Twins (1975)
 The Raffle (1991)
 Raffles: (1930, 1939 & 1958)
 Raffles, the Amateur Cracksman: (1917 & 1925)
 Rafiki (2018)
 Rafoo Chakkar (1975)
 The Raft of the Dead (1921)
 Raftaar (1975)
 Rafťáci (2006)
 Rafter Romance (1933)

Rag

 Rag Ball (1930)
 Rag Doll (1961)
 The Rag Man (1925)
 Rag Tag (2006)
 Rag Tale (2005)
 Rag Union (2015)
 The Rag-Picker (1896)
 Raga (1971)
 Ragalaipuram (2013)
 The Ragamuffin (1916)
 Ragan (1968)
 Ragasiya Police (1995)
 Ragasiya Police 115 (1968)
 Ragasiyamai (2003)
 Ragavan (2009)
 Ragazza alla pari (1976)
 Ragazze da marito (1952)
 Ragazzi del Juke-Box (1959)
 Ragdoll (1999)
 Rage: (1966, 1972, 1997, 1999, 2006, 2009 American, 2009 Spanish, 2014 & 2016)
 The Rage: (1997, 2002, 2007, 2008)
 Rage of the Buccaneers (1961)
 Rage at Dawn (1955)
 A Rage in Harlem (1991)
 Rage in Heaven (1941)
 Rage of Honor (1987)
 A Rage to Live (1965)
 The Rage of Paris: (1921 & 1938)
 The Rage in Placid Lake (2003)
 Rage of the Yeti (2011)
 The Rage: Carrie 2 (1999)
 Raggare! (1959)
 The Ragged Edge (1923)
 The Ragged Messenger (1917)
 The Ragged Princess (1916)
 Raggedy Ann & Andy: A Musical Adventure (1977)
 Raggedy Ann and Raggedy Andy (1941)
 Raggedy Man (1981)
 The Raggedy Rawney (1988)
 Raggedy Rose (1926)
 Ragging (1973)
 Raghavendra (2003)
 Raghu Romeo (2003)
 Raghupathi Raghavan Rajaram (1977)
 Raghupati Raghav Rajaram (2015)
 Raghuvamsham (1978)
 Raghuvinte Swantham Raziya (2011)
 Ragile Jwala (1981)
 Raging Barbora (1935)
 Raging Bull (1980)
 Raging Fire (2021)
 Raging Fists (1975)
 The Raging Moon (1971)
 Raging Phoenix (2009)
 Raging Sharks (2005)
 Raging Sun, Raging Sky (2009)
 The Raging Tide (1951)
 Ragini (1968)
 Ragini MMS series:
 Ragini MMS (2011)
 Ragini MMS 2 (2014)
 The Ragman's Daughter (1972)
 Rags: (1915 & 2012)
 Rags to Riches: (1922 & 1941)
 Rags and Silk (1925)
 Rags and Tatters (2013)
 Ragtime: (1927 & 1981)
 Ragtime Cowboy Joe (1940)
 Ragtime Snap Shots (1915)
 Raguluthunna Bharatham (1992)

Rah–Rai

 Rahaei (1982/83)
 Rahasya (2015)
 Rahasya Police (2009)
 Rahasya Rathri (1980)
 Rahasyam: (1967 & 1969)
 Rahasyarathri (1974)
 Rahe Chardi Kala Punjab Di (2012)
 Rahi (1952)
 Rahm (2016)
 Rahtree Reborn (2009)
 Rahu Ketu (1978)
 Rahul (2001)
 Rahul's Arranged Marriage (2005)
 RahXephon: Pluralitas Concentio (2003)
 Raid: (1921, 1947, 2003 & 2018)
 The Raid 2 (2014)
 The Raid: Redemption (2011)
 Raid on Entebbe (1977 TV)
 Raid on Rommel (1971)
 Raid in St. Pauli (1932)
 Raiden (1928)
 The Raiders: (1952 & 1963)
 Raiders from Beneath the Sea (1964)
 Raiders of Old California (1957)
 Raiders of the Living Dead (1986)
 Raiders of the Lost Ark (1981)
 Raiders of San Joaquin (1943)
 Raiders of Sunset Pass (1943)
 The Railroad (2007)
 Railroad Tigers (2016)
 Railroaded! (1947)
 The Railway Children: (1970 & 2000 TV)
 The Railway Man (2013)
 Rain: (1929, 1932, 2001, 2005, 2006, 2008 & 2016)
 Rain Clouds over Wushan (1995)
 Rain Man (1988)
 The Rain People (1969)
 Rainbow: (1921, 1944, 1978 TV, 1996, 2005 & 2008)
 The Rainbow: (1917, 1929, 1989 & 2016)
 Rainbow Bird and Monster Man (2002)
 Rainbow Brite and the Star Stealer (1985)
 Rainbow Song (2006)
 Rainbow's Sunset (2018)
 Raincoat (2004)
 Raining in the Mountain (1979)
 The Rainmaker: (1956 & 1997)
 The Rains Came (1939)
 The Rains of Ranchipur (1955)
 Raintree County (1957)
 A Rainy Day in New York (2019)
 Rainy Dog (1997)
 Rainy Seasons (2010)
 Raise the Red Lantern (1991)
 Raise the Roof (1930)
 Raise the Titanic (1980)
 Raise Your Voice (2004)
 A Raisin in the Sun: (1961 & 2008)
 Raising Arizona (1987)
 Raising Bertie (2016)
 Raising Buchanan (2019)
 Raising Cain (1992)
 Raising Helen (2004)
 Raising Jeffrey Dahmer (2006)
 Raising the Roof (1972)
 Raising Victor Vargas (2003)
 Raising the Wind: (1925 & 1961)

Raj

 Raj Nartaki (1941)
 Raj Tilak (1958)
 Raj Vishnu (2017)
 Raja: (1943, 1972, 1995, 1999, 2002 & 2003)
 Raja Aur Runk (1968)
 Raja Babu (1994)
 Raja Bakthi (1960)
 Raja Bersiong (1968)
 Raja Bhaiya (2003)
 Raja Cheyyi Vesthe (2016)
 Raja Chinna Roja (1989)
 Raja Dangdut (1978)
 Raja Desingu (1960)
 Raja Enga Raja (1995)
 Raja Harishchandra (1913)
 Raja Hindustani (1996)
 Raja Horu (2013)
 Raja Huli (2013)
 Raja Jani (1972)
 Raja Jhia Sathe Heigala Bhaba (2012)
 Raja Kaiya Vacha (1990)
 Raja Kempu Roja (1990)
 Raja Ki Aayegi Baraat (1996)
 Raja Ko Rani Se Pyar Ho Gaya (2000)
 Raja Kumarudu (1999)
 Raja Makutam (1960)
 Raja Malaya Simha (1959)
 Raja Mamai (2016)
 Raja Manthiri (2016)
 Raja Mariyadhai (1987)
 Raja Mukthi (1948)
 Raja Muthirai (1995)
 Raja Nagam (1974)
 Raja Nandini (1958)
 Raja Nanna Raja (1976)
 Raja Narasimha (2003)
 Raja Natwarlal (2014)
 Raja Paarvai (1981)
 Raja Pandi (1994)
 Raja Rajan (1957)
 Raja Rajendra (2015)
 Raja Ramesh (1977)
 Raja Ranguski (2018)
 Raja Rani: (1942, 1956, 1973 & 2013)
 Raja Rani Badsha (1998)
 The Rajah: (1911 & 1919)
 Rajini Murugan (2015)

Rak–Ral

 Raketeros (2013)
 Rakhe Hari Mare Ke (2003)
 Rakhi: (1962 & 2006)
 Rakhi Aur Hathkadi (1972)
 Rakhi Aur Rifle (1976)
 Rakht (2004)
 Rakhtbeej (2012)
 Rakthabandham (1951)
 Rakhwala: (1971 & 2013)
 Rakhwale (1994)
 Rakka (2017)
 Rakkayi Koyil (1993)
 Rakkhosh (2019)
 Rakkuyilin Ragasadassil (1986)
 Raksha: (1982 & 2008)
 Raksha Rekha (1949)
 Rakshadhikari Baiju Oppu (2017)
 Rakshak (1996)
 Rakshas (2018)
 Rakshasa (2005)
 Rakshasa Rajavu (2001)
 Rakshassu (1984)
 Rakshasudu: (1986 & 2019)
 Rakta Bandham (1980)
 Rakta Bandhan (1984)
 Rakta Charitra (2010)
 Rakta Golapa (1977)
 Rakta Sambandham (1962)
 Rakta Sindhuram (1985)
 Raktabhishekam (1988)
 Raktamukhi Neela (2008)
 Raktha Kanneeru (2003)
 Raktha Sakshi (1982)
 Raktha Tilakam (1988)
 Rakthabandham (1951)
 Raktham (1981)
 Rakthamillatha Manushyan (1979)
 Rakthapushpam (1970)
 Raktharakshassu 3D (2014)
 Raktokorobi (2017)
 Rakugo Eiga (2013)
 Rakugo Story (2012)
 Rally 'Round the Flag, Boys! (1958)
 Ralph Breaks the Internet (2018)

Ram

 Ram Dass, Going Home (2017)
 Ram Jaane (1995)
 Ram Ki Janmabhoomi (2019)
 Ram Laxman (2004)
 Ram Rajya: (1943 & 1967)
 Ram Ram Gangaram (1977)
 Ram Tere Kitne Naam (1985)
 Ram Teri Ganga Maili (1985)
 Rama Krishnulu (1978)
 Rama Madhav (2014)
 Rama O Rama (1988)
 Rama Paduka Pattabhishekam (1932)
 Rama Parushurama (1980)
 Rama Rama Krishna Krishna (2010)
 Rama Rama Kya Hai Dramaa? (2008)
 Rama Rama Raghu Rama (2011)
 Rama Rama Re... (2016)
 Rama Shama Bhama (2005)
 Ramaa: The Saviour (2010)
 Ramabai (2016)
 Ramabai Bhinrao Ambedkar (2011)
 Ramachaari (1991)
 Ramachandra (2003)
 Ramadasu (1964)
 Ramaiya Vastavaiya (2013)
 Ramakrishna: (2004 Kannada & 2004 Tamil)
 Ramalayam (1971)
 Ramaleela (2017)
 Raman (2008)
 Raman Abdullah (1997)
 Raman Ethanai Ramanadi (1970)
 Raman Parasuraman (1980)
 Raman Raghav 2.0 (2016)
 Raman Sreeraman (1985)
 Raman Thediya Seethai: (1972 & 2008)
 Ramanaa (2002)
 Ramanan (1967)
 Ramanna Shamanna (1988)
 Ramante Edanthottam (2017)
 Ramanujacharya (1989)
 Ramanujan (2014)
 Ramapurada Ravana (1984)
 Ramarajyadalli Rakshasaru (1990)
 Ramarajyamlo Bheemaraju (1983)
 Ramata (2007)
 Ramayan (1954)
 Ramayana: The Epic (2010)
 Ramayana: The Legend of Prince Rama (1992)
 Ramanyanam (1996)
 Ramayanam Lo Tuppakula Veta (2016)
 Ramayani (1945)
 Ramayya Vasthavayya (2013)
 Rambaan (1948)
 Rambaiyin Kaadhal: (1939 & 1956)
 Rambantu (1996)
 Rambha Rambabu (1990)
 Rambhajjan Zindabaad (TBD)
 Rambling Rose (1991)
 Rambo series:
 Rambo: First Blood Part II (1985)
 Rambo III (1988)
 Rambo (2007)
 Rambo: Last Blood (2019)
 Ramchand Pakistani (2008)
 Ramdhanu (2014)
 Ramen Teh (2018)
 Rameswaram (2007)
 Ramgarh Ke Sholay (1991)
 Ramin (2011)
 Ramji Londonwaley (2005)
 Ramji Rao Speaking (1989)
 Ramkinkar Baij (unreleased)
 Ramleela (2015)
 Rammbock (2010)
 Ramona: (1910, 1916, 1928, 1936, 1946 & 1961)
 Ramona and Beezus (2010)
 Rampage: (1963, 1986, 1987, 2006, 2009 & 2018)
 Rampage: Capital Punishment (2014)
 Rampage: President Down (2016)
 Rampart (2012)
 Rampo (1994)
 Ramrod (1947)
 Rams: (2015, 2018 & 2020)
 Ramshastri (1944)
 Ramta Jogi (2015)

Ran

 Ran (1985)
 Ran Kevita (2007)
 Ran Kevita 2 (2013)
 Ran Salu (1967)
 Ran Sayura (2017)
 Rana Vikrama (2015)
 Rana's Wedding (2002)
 Ranachandi (1991)
 Ranadheera (1988)
 Ranadheera Kanteerava (1960)
 Ranam: (2006 & 2018)
 Ranaranga (1988)
 Ranbanka (2015)
 Ranbhool (2010)
 Ranbhoomi (1991)
 Ranchi Diaries (2017)
 Rancho Deluxe (1975)
 Rancho Grande (1940)
 Rancho Notorious (1952)
 Rancid (2004)
 Rancid Aluminium (2000)
 Ranczo Wilkowyje (2007)
 Randidangazhi (1958)
 Randiya Dahara (2004)
 Random Acts of Violence (2019)
 Random Encounter (1998)
 Random Encounters (2013)
 Random Harvest (1942)
 Random Hearts (1999)
 Randu Janmam (1978)
 Randu Lokam (1977)
 Randu Penkuttikal (1978)
 Randy and the Mob (2007)
 Rang: (1993 & 2014)
 Rang Birangi (1983)
 Rang De Basanti (2006)
 Rang Milanti (2011)
 Rang Rasiya (2008)
 Ranga: (1982 & 2022)
 Ranga Daku (1978)
 Ranga Khush (1975)
 Ranga Rattinam (1971)
 Ranga The Donga (2010)
 Ranga SSLC (2004)
 Rangaa Patangaa (2016)
 Rangam (1985)
 Rangamati (2008)
 Rangan Style (2014)
 Ranganayaki (1981)
 Rangappa Hogbitna (2011)
 Rangasthalam (2018)
 Range War (1939)
 Rango (2011)
 Ransom (1996)
 Ransom! (1956)

Rao–Raq

 Rao Gari Illu (1988)
 Rao Gari Intlo Rowdy (1990)
 Rao Saheb (1985)
 Raoni (1978)
 Raoul Wallenberg: Buried Alive (1983)
 Rapa Nui (1994)
 Rapado (1992)
 Rape (1971)
 Rape of the Belt (1964)
 Rape Culture (1975)
 The Rape of Europa (2007)
 Rape of Love (1978)
 Rape and Marriage: The Rideout Case (1980 TV)
 Rape Me (2000)
 Rape Squad (1974)
 Rape of the Sword (1967)
 Raped by an Angel (1993)
 Raped by an Angel 2: The Uniform Fan (1998)
 Raped with Eyes: Daydream (1982)
 Raphael, or The Debauched One (1971)
 Rapid Fire: (1989, 1992 & 2006 TV)
 Rapid Fire Romance (1926)
 Rappadikalude Gatha (1978)
 Rappakal (2005)
 Rappin' (1985)
 Rapsodia Bałtyku (1935)
 Rapt (2009)
 Raptor (2001)
 Raptor Ranch (2012)
 Rapture: (1950 & 1965)
 The Rapture (1991)
 Rapture-Palooza (2013)
 Raqeeb (2007)
 Raqt (2013)

Rar–Ras

 Rara (2016)
 Raraju: (1984 & 2006)
 Rarandoi Veduka Chudham (2017)
 Rare Beasts (2019)
 Rare Birds (2001)
 The Rare Breed (1966)
 Rare Exports: A Christmas Tale (2010)
 Rarichan Enna Pauran (1956)
 Rasaleela (2012)
 Rasam (2015)
 Rasathanthram (2006)
 Rasathi Varum Naal (1991)
 Rascal (1969)
 Rascal Does Not Dream of a Dreaming Girl (2019)
 Rascals: (1938 & 2011)
 Rascals on the Road (2005)
 Rascals and Robbers: The Secret Adventures of Tom Sawyer and Huckleberry Finn (1982 TV)
 Rasen (1998)
 Rasganço (2001)
 RASH (2005)
 Rashōmon (1950)
 Rashtram (2006)
 Rasigan (1994)
 Rasigar Mandram (2007)
 Rasika (1994)
 Rasikan (2004)
 Rasikkum Seemane (2010)
 Rasili (1946)
 Raskolnikow (1923)
 Rasmus, Pontus och Toker (1966)
 The Raspberry Reich (2004)
 Raspoutine (2011)
 Rasputin: (1928, 1938, 1954, 2011 & 2015)
 Rasputin, the Black Monk (1917)
 Rasputin: Dark Servant of Destiny (1996)
 Rasputin, Demon with Women (1932)
 Rasputin and the Empress (1932)
 Rasputin, the Holy Sinner (1928)
 Rasputin the Mad Monk (1966)

Rat

 Rat (2000)
 The Rat Pack (1998 TV)
 Rat Pack Rat (2014)
 Rat Pfink a Boo Boo (1966)
 Rat Race (2001)
 Rat Rod Rockers! (2010)
 The Rat Savior (1976)
 Rat Trap (1963)
 Ratanpur (2018)
 Ratatouille (2007)
 Ratboy (1986)
 Ratcatcher (1999)
 Ratchagan (1997)
 Ratchet & Clank (2016)
 Rated X (2000)
 Ratha Kanneer (1954)
 Ratha Paasam: (1954 & 1980)
 Ratha Sapthami (1986)
 Ratha Thilagam (1963)
 Rathavara (2015)
 Rathilayam (1983)
 Rathimanmadhan (1977)
 Rathinapuri Ilavarasi (1960)
 Rathinirvedam: (1978 & 2011)
 Rathna (1998)
 Rathna Manjari (1962)
 Rathnagiri Rahasya (1957)
 Rathri Mazha (2007)
 Rathrivandi (1971)
 Raththa Dhanam (1988)
 The Ratings Game (1984 TV)
 Ration Bored (1943)
 Rationing (1944)
 Ratko: The Dictator's Son (2009)
 Ratman (1988)
 Ratna Deepam (1953)
 Ratna Moetoe Manikam (1940s)
 Ratnadeep (1979)
 Ratnakumar (1949)
 Ratnamala (1947)
 Ratnamanjarii (2019)
 Raton Pass (1951)
 Ratrir Jatri (2019)
 Rats (2016) 
 Rats and Cats (2007)
 Rats: Night of Terror (1984)
 Rats in the Ranks (1996)
 Ratsasan (2018)
 Ratskin (1929)
 Rattan (1944)
 Ratter (2015)
 Rattle the Cage (2015)
 Rattle and Hum (1988)
 Rattle of a Simple Man (1964)
 Rattlers (1976)
 Rattlesnake (2019)
 Ratty (1986)
 Ratón de ferretería (1985)
 El Ratón Pérez (2006)

Rau–Raz

 Raul: Straight to Kill (2005)
 Ravager (1997)
 Ravagers (1979)
 Ravan Raaj: A True Story (1995)
 Ravana Desam (2013) 
 Ravanan: (1994 & 2006)
 Ravanna (2000)
 Ravanude Ramudayithe? (1979)
 Rave (2000)
 Raven (1996)
 The Raven: (1915, 1935, 1963, 2006 & 2012)
 Raven Hawk (1996 TV)
 Raven's End (1963)
 Ravens (2017)
 Ravenous: (1999 & 2017)
 Ravex in Tezuka World (2009)
 Ravimama (1999)
 Raving (2007)
 Raving Iran (2016)
 Ravished Armenia (1919)
 Ravivarma (1992)
 Raw (2016)
 Raw Deal: (1948, 1977 & 1986)
 Raw Edge (1956)
 Raw Force (1982)
 Raw Justice (1994)
 Raw Nerve: (1990, 1991 & 1999)
 Raw Opium (2011)
 Raw! Raw! Rooster! (1956)
 Raw Silk (1988)
 Raw Timber (1937)
 Raw Wind in Eden (1958)
 Rawhead Rex (1987)
 Rawhide: (1926, 1938 & 1951)
 Rawhide Mail (1934)
 Rawhide Rangers (1941)
 Ray (2004)
 Ray Donovan: The Movie (2022 TV)
 Ray Harryhausen: Special Effects Titan (2011)
 Ray & Liz (2018)
 Ray Meets Helen (2017)
 Ray of Sunshine (1919)
 Ray's Male Heterosexual Dance Hall (1987)
 Raya and the Last Dragon (2021)
 Rayaru Bandaru Mavana Manege (1993)
 Rayilukku Neramachu (1988)
 Raymond & Ray (2022)
 Rayudugaru Nayudugaru (1996)
 Raze (2013)
 Razing the Bar (2014)
 Raziya Sultan (1983)
 Razor Blade Smile (1998)
 The Razor's Edge: (1946 & 1984)
 Razor's Edge: The Legacy of Iranian Actresses (2016)
 Razorback (1984)
 Razzia (2017)
 Razzia sur la chnouf (1955)
 Razzle Dazzle: A Journey into Dance (2007)

Re

 ...Re (2016)
 Re-Animated (2006)
 Re-Animator (1985)
 ReBoot: Daemon Rising (2001)
 ReBoot: My Two Bobs (2001)
 Re:Born (2016)
 Re-cycle (2006)
 ReGeneration (2010)
 Re-Kill (2015)
 ReLIFE (2017)
 Re Ru (1999)
 ReWined (2013)

Rea

 Reach for Glory (1962)
 Reach for Me (2008)
 Reach the Rock (1998)
 Reach for the Sky: (1956 & 2001)
 Reaching from Heaven (1948)
 Reaching for the Moon: (1917, 1930 & 2013)
 Reaching for the Stars (1955)
 Reaching for the Sun (1941)
 Reaction: A Portrait of a Society in Crisis (1973)
 Read It and Weep (2006 TV)
 Read My Lips (2001)
 The Reader: (1988 & 2008)
 Readin' and Writin' (1932)
 Ready: (2008 & 2011)
 Ready Money (1914)
 Ready or Not: (2009 & 2019)
 Ready Player One (2018) 
 Ready to Rumble (2000)
 Ready, Set, Zoom! (1955)
 Ready, Steady, Charlie! (2003)
 Ready, Willing, and Able (1937)
 Ready, Woolen and Able (1960)
 Reagan: (2011 & 2023)
 The Real Badlands (2009)
 The Real Blonde (1997)
 The Real Cancun (2003)
 Real Genius (1985)
 Real Life: (1979 & 2004)
 The Real McCoy (1993)
 Real Steel (2011)
 Real Women Have Curves (2002)
 A Real Young Girl (1976)
 Reality Bites (1994)
 Reality High (2017)
 The Realm (2018)
 Reap the Wild Wind (1942)
 Reaper (2014)
 The Reaper: (2013 & 2014)
 The Reaping (2007)
 Rear Window (1954)
 Reasonable Doubt (2014)

Reb

 Rebecca: (1940, 1963, 2016 & 2020)
 Rebecca H. (Return to the Dogs) (2010)
 Rebecca of Sunnybrook Farm: (1917, 1932 & 1938)
 Rebecca Uthup Kizhakkemala (2013)
 Rebel: (1985, 2012 & 2014)
 The Rebel: (1915, 1931, 1932, 1961, 1980 French, 1980 Italian, 1993 & 2007)
 Rebel City (1953)
 Rebel Hearts (2021)
 Rebel High (1987)
 Rebel Liesel (1920)
 Rebel Love (1985)
 Rebel in Paradise (1960)
 Rebel Rabbit (1949)
 Rebel Scum (2015)
 The Rebel Rousers (1970)
 Rebel in the Rye (2017)
 Rebel in Town (1956)
 Rebel Without Claws (1961)
 Rebel Without a Cause (1955)
 Rebel Without a House (1960)
 Rebelión en los llanos (1953)
 Rebellion: (1936, 1954, 1975, 2009 & 2011)
 Rebellion: The Killing Isle (2008)
 Rebellion: the Litvinenko Case (2007)
 The Rebels (1979 TV)
 Rebels of the Neon God (1992)
 Rebirth: (2011 & 2016)
 Rebirth of Mothra (1996)
 Rebirth of Mothra II (1997)
 Rebirth of Mothra III (1998)
 Reborn (TBD)
 Rebound: (1931 & 2005)
 The Rebound (2009)
 Rebound: The Legend of Earl "The Goat" Manigault (1996 TV)
 Rebuilding Paradise (2020)

Rec

 Recalled (2021)
 Rec series:
 Rec (2007)
 Rec 2 (2009)
 Rec 3: Genesis (2013)
 Rec 4: Apocalypse (2014)
 Recep İvedik series:
 Recep İvedik (2008)
 Recep İvedik 2 (2009)
 Recep İvedik 3 (2010)
 Recep İvedik 4 (2014)
 Recep İvedik 5 (2017)
 Recep İvedik 6 (2019)
 Reception (2011)
 Recess series:
 Recess: School's Out (2001)
 Recess Christmas: Miracle on Third Street (2001)
 Recess: All Growed Down (2003)
 Recess: Taking the Fifth Grade (2003)
 Reckless: (1935, 1951, 1984, & 1995)
 Reckless Disregard (1985)
 Reckless Kelly (1993)
 Reckless Living: (1931 & 1938)
 The Reckless Moment (1949)
 Reckless Roads (1935)
 Reckless Youth: (1922 & 1931)
 The Reckoning: (1908, 1932, 1970, 2003, 2014 & 2020)
 Reclaim (2014)
 Reclaim Wasteland (1926)
 Reclaim Your Brain (2007)
 Reclaiming the Blade (2009)
 Reclaiming Their Voice: The Native American Vote in New Mexico & Beyond (2009)
 Recollections of Pavlovsk (1984)
 Recollections of the Yellow House (1989)
 Reconstitution (1970)
 The Record (2000)
 The Record of a Tenement Gentleman (1947)
 The Recruit (2003)

Red

 Red: (1970, 2002, 2008, 2010 & 2021)
 RED 2 (2013)
 Red 11 (2019)
 Red Amnesia (2014)
 Red Angel (1966)
 Red Army (2014)
 The Red Awn (2007)
 The Red Badge of Courage: (1951 & 1974 TV)
 The Red Balloon (1956)
 The Red Baron (2007)
 Red Beard (1965)
 Red Cherry (1995)
 Red Christmas (2016)
 Red Cliff (2008-2009)
 Red Corner (1997)
 Red Cow (2018)
 Red Dawn: (1984 & 2012)
 Red Desert (1964)
 Red Dog (2011)
 Red Dot (2021)
 Red Dragon: (1965 & 2002)
 Red Dust: (1932, 1999 & 2004)
 Red Eye (2005)
 Red Firecracker, Green Firecracker (1994)
 Red Headed Stranger (1986)
 Red Heat: (1985 & 1988)
 Red Hill (2010)
 Red Hook Summer (2012)
 Red Hot Riding Hood (1943)
 The Red House (1947)
 The Red Inn: (1951 & 2007)
 Red Joan (2018)
 Red Lights: (1923, 2004 & 2012)
 The Red Menace (1949)
 Red Monarch (1983) (TV)
 The Red Monks (1989)
 Red Notice (2021)
 Red Planet (2000)
 The Red Pony: (1949 & 1973 TV)
 Red Post on Escher Street (2020)
 Red Psalm (1972)
 Red Riding Hood: (1901, 1989, 2003, 2006 & 2011)
 Red River: (1948 & 2009)
 Red River Range (1938)
 Red River Valley: (1941 & 1997)
 Red Road (2006)
 Red Rock West (1993)
 Red Rocket (2021)
 Red Rose White Rose (1994)
 Red Scorpion (1989)
 The Red Sea Diving Resort (2019)
 The Red Shoes: (1948, 2005 & 2010)
 Red Snow: (1952, 2019 & 2021)
 Red Sonja (1985)
 Red Sorghum (1988)
 Red Sparrow (2018)
 Red State: (2006 & 2011)
 Red Sun (1972)
 Red Sundown (1956)
 Red Tails (2012)
 The Red Turtle (2016)
 The Red Violin (1998)
 The Red and the White (1967)
 Red White & Blue (2010)
 Red-Headed Woman (1932)
 Redacted (2007)
 Redbelt (2008)
 Redd Inc (2012)
 Redeeming Love: (1916 & 2022)
 The Redemption (1924)
 Redemption Road (2010)
 Redemption: The Stan Tookie Williams Story (2004) (TV)
 The Redhead from Wyoming (1953)
 Redline: (2007 & 2009)
 Redneck Zombies (1986)
 Reds (1981)
 Redskin (1929)

Ree–Ref

 The Reef: (1999 & 2010)
 The Reef 2: High Tide (2012)
 The Reef: Stalked (2022)
 Reefer Madness: (1936 & 2005 TV)
 Reefer and the Model (1988)
 Reeker (2006)
 Reel Bad Arabs (2006)
 Reel in the Closet (2015)
 Reel Love (2011 TV)
 Reel Zombies (2008)
 The Reenactment (1968)
 Reencuentro con la gloria (1962)
 The Ref (1994)
 The Referee (2010)
 Reference (1985)
 The Reflecting Skin (1990)
 Reflection: (2018 & 2021)
 A Reflection of Fear (1972)
 Reflections in Black (1975)
 Reflections on a Crime (1994)
 Reflections in Dark Glasses (1960 TV)
 Reflections in a Dark Sky (1991)
 Reflections in a Golden Eye (1967)
 Reflections of Murder (1974 TV)
 Reform School Girl: (1957 & 1994 TV)
 Reform School Girls (1986)
 Reformation (2015)
 The Reformation of the Suffragettes (1911)
 A Reformed Santa Claus (1911)
 The Reformer and the Redhead (1950)
 The Reformers (1916)
 The Refrigerator (1991)
 Refrigerator Mothers (2003 TV)
 Refuge: (1923 & 2012)
 The Refuge (2009)
 Refuge: Stories of the Selfhelp Home (2012)
 Refugee: (2000 & 2006)
 Refugees (1933)

Reg–Rem

 Reg'lar Fellers (1941)
 Regarding Henry (1991)
 Regarding Susan Sontag (2014 TV)
 Regel nr. 1 (2003)
 Regeneration: (1915 & 1997)
 ReGeneration (2010)
 Regina (1987)
 Regine: (1927, 1935 & 1956)
 Registered Nurse (1934)
 Regresa (2010)
 Regression (2015)
 Regret to Inform (1998)
 Regular Guys (1996)
 Regular Lovers (2005)
 Regular Show: The Movie (2015)
 Rehearsal (2015)
 The Rehearsal (1974 & 2016)
 Rehearsal for Murder (1982 TV)
 Rehnaa Hai Terre Dil Mein (2001)
 Reichenbach Falls (2007)
 Reign of Assassins (2010)
 Reign Behind a Curtain (1983)
 Reign of Fire (2002)
 Reign of the Gargoyles (2007 TV)
 Reign Over Me (2007)
 Reign of the Supermen (2019)
 Reign of Terror (1949)
 Reina de reinas: La Virgen María (1948)
 Reincarnation (2006)
 The Reincarnation of Peter Proud (1975)
 Reindeer Games (2000)
 Reindeerspotting: Escape from Santaland (2010)
 Reise ins Ehebett (1966)
 Reisender Krieger (1981 TV)
 The Reivers (1969)
 Rejected (2000)
 The Rejected (1961)
 Rejection (2011)
 Rejuvenatrix (1988)
 Rekha (1943)
 Rekka (2016)
 Relaks, It's Just Pag-ibig (2014)
 Relationship Dilemma (2015)
 Relative Chaos (2006 TV)
 Relative Values (2000)
 Relatives: (1985 & 2006)
 Relax...It's Just Sex (1998)
 Relaxer (2018)
 The Reliant (2019)
 Relic (2020)
 The Relic (1997)
 Religulous (2008)
 The Reluctant Astronaut (1967)
 The Reluctant Debutante (1958)
 The Reluctant Dragon (1941)
 The Reluctant Fundamentalist (2012)
 The Reluctant Sadist (1967)
 The Reluctant Saint (1962)
 The Remains of the Day (1993)
 Rembrandt (1936, 1940, 1942 & 1999)
 Remember: (1926, 2015 & 2022)
 Remember Last Night? (1935)
 Remember Me: (1979, 1985 TV, 2010, 2013 & 2019)
 Remember My Name (1978)
 Remember the Night (1940)
 Remember Pearl Harbor (1942)
 Remember the Titans (2000)
 Rememory (2017)
 Reminiscence: (2017 & 2021)
 Reminiscences of a Journey to Lithuania (1972)
 Remo Williams: The Adventure Begins (1985)
 Remorse at Death (1948)
 Remote: (1993 & 2004)
 Remote Control: (1930, 1988 & 1992)

Ren

 Rena (1938)
 Renaissance: (1964 & 2006)
 Renaissance Man (1994)
 Renaldo and Clara (1978)
 Renart the Fox (2005)
 Rencontre avec le dragon (2003)
 Rendel (2017)
 Rendella Tharuvatha (2005)
 Rendez-vous (1985)
 Rendez-vous avec Maurice Chevalier n°1 (1954)
 Rendez-vous avec Maurice Chevalier n°2 (1954)
 Rendez-vous avec Maurice Chevalier n°3 (1954)
 Rendezvous: (1930 & 1935)
 Rendezvous with Annie (1946)
 Rendezvous at Bray (1971)
 Rendezvous at Corfu (1960)
 Rendezvous with Death (2006)
 Rendezvous with Dishonour (1970)
 Rendezvous in July (1949)
 Rendezvous at Midnight (1935)
 Rendezvous in Paris (1982)
 Rendezvous in Paris (1995)
 Rendezvous in Space (1964)
 Rendition (2007)
 Rendu (2006)
 Rendu Jella Sita (1983)
 Rendu Pondatti Kaavalkaaran (1992)
 Rendu Rella Aaru (1986)
 The Renegade (1951)
 Renegade Force (1998)
 Renegade Girl (1946)
 Renegade Riders (1967)
 Renegade Trail (1939)
 Renegades: (1930, 1946, 1989 & 2017)
 Renegades of the Rio Grande (1945)
 Renegades of Sonora (1948)
 Renegades of the West (1932)
 Renewal (2008)
 Renfield (2023)
 Renfrew of the Royal Mounted (1937)
 Reno: (1923, 1930 & 1939)
 Reno 911!: Miami (2007)
 Reno and the Doc (1984)
 Renoir (2012)
 Rent (2005)
 Rent Control: (1984 & 2005 TV)
 Rent-a-Cat (2012)
 Rent-a-Cop (1987)
 Rent-a-Kid (1995)
 The Rental (2020)
 Rented Lips (1988)

Rep

 Repas de bébé (1895)
 Repast (1951)
 Repatriation (2004)
 Repeat Performance (1947)
 Repeaters (2010)
 Repent at Leisure (1941)
 Repentance: (1922, 1987 & 2013)
 The Replacement Killers (1998)
 The Replacements (2000)
 Replacing Dad (1999 TV)
 Replay (2001)
 Repli-Kate (2002)
 Replicant (2001)
 Replicas (2018)
 Repo Chick (2009)
 Repo Jake (1990)
 Repo Man (1984)
 Repo Men (2010)
 Repo! The Genetic Opera (2008)
 Report (1967)
 The Report: (1977 & 2019)
 Report to the Commissioner (1975)
 Report on Death (1993)
 A Report on the Party and the Guests (1966)
 Reportage 57 (1959)
 Reportaje (1953)
 Reportaje a un cadaver (1955)
 Reported Missing (1937)
 Reporter (2009)
 The Reporter (2015)
 Repossessed (1990)
 Reprisal (2018)
 Reprise (2006)
 The Reptile (1966)
 Reptilian (1999)
 Reptilicant (2006)
 Reptilicus (1961)
 Reptiloid (2013)
 Repulsion (1965)
 Reputation: (1917 & 1921)

Req–Res

 Requiem: (1982, 1995  & 2006)
 Requiem for Billy the Kid (2006)
 Requiem for Dominic (1991)
 Requiem for a Dream (2000)
 Requiem for a Gringo (1968)
 Requiem for a Gunfighter (1965)
 Requiem for a Handsome Bastard (1992)
 Requiem for a Heavyweight (1962)
 Requiem for Mrs. J (2017)
 Requiem pro panenku (1992)
 Requiem for a Secret Agent (1966)
 Requiem of Snow (2005)
 Requiem pour un Vampire (1971)
 Requiem pro panenku (1992)
 Requirements to Be a Normal Person (2015)
 Rerun (2018)
 Resan (1987)
 Resan bort (1945)
 Resan till dej (1953)
 The Rescue: (1917, 1929 & 1988)
 Rescue Dawn (2007)
 Rescue from Gilligan's Island (1978)
 Rescue Heroes: The Movie (2003)
 Rescue Me (1992)
 The Rescue on the River (1896)
 Rescue Squad (1935)
 Rescued from an Eagle's Nest (1908)
 Rescued by Rover (1905)
 The Rescuers (1977)
 The Rescuers Down Under (1990)
 The Rescuing Angel (1919)
 Reservation Road (2007)
 Reserved for the Death (1963)
 Reservoir Dogs (1992)
 Reset (2017)
 Resham Filili (2015)
 Resham Ki Dori (1974)
 Reshma Aur Shera (1971)
 Reshmi Sari (1940)
 The Resident (2011)
 Resident Alien (1990)
 Resident Evil series:
 Resident Evil (2002)
 Resident Evil: Apocalypse (2004)
 Resident Evil: Extinction (2007)
 Resident Evil: Degeneration (2008)
 Resident Evil: Afterlife (2010)
 Resident Evil: Retribution (2012)
 Resident Evil: Damnation (2012)
 Resident Evil: The Final Chapter (2016)
 Resident Evil: Vendetta (2017)
 Resident Evil: Welcome to Raccoon City (2021)
 The Resistance (2011)
 The Resistance Banker (2018)
 Resolution (2012)
 Respect (2021)
 Respiro (2002)
 The Response (2008)
 Ressha Sentai ToQger vs. Kyoryuger: The Movie (2015)
 The Rest Cure (1923)
 The Rest Is Silence: (1959 & 2007)
 Rest Stop (2006)
 Rest Stop: Don’t Look Back (2008)
 The Restless (2006)
 The Restless Breed (1957)
 The Restless Conscience: Resistance to Hitler Within Germany 1933-1945 (1992)
 The Restless and the Damned (1959)
 Restless Natives (1985)
 The Restless Sex (1920)
 The Restless Spirit (1913)
 The Restless Years (1958)
 Restoration (1995)
 The Restoration (1910)
 The Restorers (2003)
 Restraint (2008)
 Restrepo (2010)
 Restricted Call (2021)
 Resurface (2017)
 Resurrected (1989)
 The Resurrected (1991)
 Resurrecting the Champ (2007)
 Resurrection: (1909, 1912, 1918, 1923, 1931, 1944, 1958, 1960, 1980, 1999, 2001, 2016 Argentine, 2016 Mexican & 2022)
 The Resurrection of Broncho Billy (1970)
 The Resurrection of Gavin Stone (2017)
 The Resurrection of the Golden Wolf (1979)
 Resurrection of the Little Match Girl (2002)
 The Resurrection of Zachary Wheeler (1971)

Ret

 Retablo (2017)
 Retenez Moi...Ou Je Fais Un Malheur (1984)
 El Retorno del Hombre Lobo (1980)
 El Retorno de Walpurgis (1973)
 Retouch (2017)
 Le Retour à la Raison (1923)
 Le Retour d'un aventurier (1966)
 Retrato de Familia (1976)
 Retreat (2011)
 Retribution: (1921, 1987, 2006 & 2015)
 Retrieval (2006)
 Retroactive (1997)
 Retrograde (2004)
 Return: (1985, 2010 & 2011)
 The Return: (1980, 2003, 2006 & 2013)
 Return to the 36th Chamber (1980)
 Return from the Ashes (1965)
 Return to the Batcave: The Misadventures of Adam and Burt (2003) (TV)
 Return of the Blind Dead (1973)
 Return to the Blue Lagoon (1991)
 Return to Boggy Creek (1977)
 The Return of Captain Invincible (1983)
 The Return of Captain Nemo (1978) (TV)
 The Return of Count Yorga (1971)
 The Return of Dr. Fu Manchu (1930)
 Return to Eden (1983)
 Return of the Fly (1959)
 The Return of Frank James (1940)
 Return to Frogtown (1993)
 Return to Glennascaul (1951)
 The Return of Godzilla (1984)
 Return to Halloweentown (2006) (TV)
 Return of the Hero (2018)
 Return to Horror High (1987)
 Return to House on Haunted Hill (2007)
 Return to Innocence (2001)
 The Return of Jafar (1994)
 Return of the Jedi (1983)
 Return of the Killer Tomatoes! (1988)
 The Return of the King (1980)
 Return of the Living Dead series:
 The Return of the Living Dead (1985)
 Return of the Living Dead Part II (1988)
 Return of the Living Dead 3 (1993)
 Return of the Living Dead: Necropolis (2005)
 Return of the Living Dead: Rave to the Grave (2005)
 Return to the Lost World (1992)
 Return of the Magnificent Seven (1966)
 The Return of a Man Called Horse (1976)
 The Return of Martin Guerre (1982)
 Return to Me (2000)
 The Return of the Musketeers (1989)
 Return to Never Land (2002)
 Return to Oz (1985)
 Return to Paradise (1998)
 The Return of the Pink Panther (1975)
 Return of Sabata (1971)
 A Return to Salem's Lot (1987)
 Return of the Secaucus 7 (1980)
 Return of the Seven (1966)
 Return to Sleepaway Camp (2008)
 The Return of Superfly (1990)
 The Return of Swamp Thing (1989)
 The Return of the Vampire (1943)
 Return from Witch Mountain (1978)
 Returner (2002)

Reu–Rey

 Reuben, Reuben (1983)
 Reunion: (1932, 1936, 1980 TV, 1989, 2001 & 2012)
 The Reunion: (1963, 2011 American, 2011 Danish, 2012 & 2013)
 Reunion at Fairborough (1985) (TV)
 Reunion in France (1942)
 Reunion in Reno (1951)
 Reunion in Rhythm (1937)
 Reunion in Vienna (1933)
 Reuniting the Rubins (2010)
 Revak the Rebel (1960)
 Revanche (2008)
 Revathikkoru Pavakkutty (1986)
 Revati (2005)
 Reveille (1924)
 Reveille with Beverly (1943)
 Reveille: The Great Awakening (1925)
 Revelation: (1918, 1924 & 2001)
 Revelations of an Insomniac (1991)
 The Revenant: (2009 & 2015)
 Revenge: (1918, 1928, 1948, 1971, 1978, 1985, 1989, 1990 & 2007)
 The Revenge (2002)
 Revenge of the Bandits (1922)
 Revenge of the Barbarians (1960)
 Revenge of Black Eagle (1951)
 Revenge of the Boarding School Dropouts (2009)
 Revenge of the Bridesmaids (2010) (TV)
 Revenge of a Crazy Girl (1951)
 Revenge of the Creature (1955)
 Revenge for Eddy (1929)
 The Revenge of Frankenstein (1958)
 Revenge of the Green Dragons (2014)
 Revenge for Jolly! (2012)
 Revenge Is Mine (1919)
 Revenge of Itzik Finkelstein (1993)
 Revenge for Love (2017)
 Revenge of the Nerds series:
 Revenge of the Nerds (1984)
 Revenge of the Nerds II: Nerds in Paradise (1987)
 Revenge of the Nerds III: The Next Generation (1992)
 Revenge of the Nerds IV: Nerds in Love (1994)
 Revenge of the Ninja (1983)
 Revenge of the Pink Panther (1978)
 Revenge Quest (1995)
 Revenge of The Gladiators (1964)
 The Revenge of the Whore (2012) (TV)
 Revenge: A Love Story (2010)
 Reversal of Fortune: (1990 & 2003)
 The Revisionaries (2012)
 Revolt of the Zombies (1936)
 Revolution: (1933, 1968, 1985 & 2012)
 Revolution OS (2001)
 Revolution of Pigs (2004)
 The Revolution Will Not Be Televised (2002)
 Revolutionary Road (2009)
 Revolver: (1973 & 2005)
 Reward Unlimited (1944)
 Rewind: (2013 TV & 2019)
 Rewind This! (2013)
 Rey (2015)
 Reykjavik Whale Watching Massacre (2009)
 The Rezort (2015)

Rh

 Rhaatee (2015)
 Rhapsody (1954)
 Rhapsody in August (1991)
 A Rhapsody in Black and Blue (1932)
 Rhapsody in Blue (1945)
 Rhapsody of Happiness (1947)
 Rhapsody Rabbit (1946)
 Rhapsody in Rivets (1941)
 Rhapsody of Spring (1998)
 Rheinsberg (1967)
 Rhinegold (1978)
 The Rhineland Girl (1930)
 Rhinestone (1984)
 Rhino Season (2012)
 Rhinoceros (1974)
 Rhinoceros Eyes (2003)
 Rhubarb: (1951 & 1969)
 Rhubarb Rhubarb (1980)
 Rhyme & Reason (1997)
 Rhymes for Young Ghouls (2013)
 Rhythm: (2000 & 2016)
 Rhythm in the Air (1936)
 Rhythm and Blues Revue (1955)
 Rhythm in the Clouds (1937)
 Rhythm of a Crime (1981)
 Rhythm Inn (1951)
 Rhythm Is It! (2004)
 Rhythm of the Islands (1943)
 The Rhythm of My Life: Ismael Sankara (2011)
 Rhythm Parade (1942)
 Rhythm Racketeer (1937)
 Rhythm on the Range (1936)
 Rhythm on the Reservation (1939)
 Rhythm in a Riff (1947)
 Rhythm on the River (1940)
 Rhythm of the Saddle (1938)
 Rhythm, Salt and Pepper (1951)
 The Rhythm Section (2020)
 Rhythm Serenade (1943)
 Rhythm Thief (1994)
 Rhythm of the Wave (1974)
 Rhythm and Weep (1946)

Ri

Rib–Ric

 Ribbit (2014)
 Ribbon (2017)
 Ribo ou le soleil sauvage (1978)
 Rice (1963)
 Rice People (1994)
 The Rice People (1957)
 Rice Rhapsody (2004)
 Rich and Famous: (1981 & 1987)
 Rich Girl (1991)
 Rich Girl, Poor Girl (1921)
 Rich Kids (1979)
 Rich in Love (1992)
 Rich Man, Poor Girl (1938)
 Rich Man, Poor Man (1918)
 Rich Man's Folly (1931)
 The Rich Man's Wife (1996)
 Rich Men, Single Women (1990 TV)
 Rich Men's Sons (1927)
 Rich People (1929)
 Rich Relations (1937)
 Rich and Strange (1931)
 Rich, Young and Beautiful (1928)
 Rich, Young and Pretty (1951)
 Richard (1972)
 Richard II (2012 TV)
 Richard III: (1912, 1955, 1995, 2007 & 2016 TV)
 Richard Cardinal: Cry from a Diary of a Métis Child (1986)
 Richard Jewell (2019)
 Richard the Lion-Hearted (1923)
 Richard the Lionheart (2013)
 Richard Pryor: Here and Now (1983)
 Richard Pryor: Live in Concert (1979)
 Richard Pryor: Live on the Sunset Strip (1982)
 Richard the Second (2001)
 Richard the Stork (2017)
 Richard's Things (1980)
 Richard's Wedding (2012)
 Riches, belles, etc. (1998)
 Richest Man in Town (1941)
 Ri¢hie Ri¢h (1994)
 Richie Rich's Christmas Wish (1998)
 Richthofen (1927)
 Ricky: (2009 & 2016)
 Ricky 1 (1988)
 Ricky 6 (2000)
 Ricochet (1991)
 Ricochet Romance (1954)
 Ricomincio da tre (1981)
 Ricordare Anna (2004)

Rid

 Riddick (2013)
 Riddler's Moon (1998 TV)
 Riddles of the Sphinx (1977)
 Ride: (1998, 2009, 2012 & 2014)
 Ride 'Em Cowboy: (1936 & 1942)
 Ride Along (2014)
 Ride Along 2 (2016)
 Ride Beyond Vengeance (1966)
 Ride Clear of Diablo (1954)
 Ride a Crooked Mile (1938)
 Ride a Crooked Trail (1958)
 Ride with the Devil (1999)
 Ride or Die: (2003 & 2021)
 Ride to Freedom (1937)
 Ride the High Country (1962)
 Ride the High Iron (1956)
 Ride Him, Bosko! (1932)
 Ride Him, Cowboy (1932)
 Ride the Hot Wind (1971)
 Ride, Kelly, Ride (1941)
 Ride Lonesome (1959)
 Ride the Man Down (1952)
 Ride Me (1994)
 Ride Out for Revenge (1957)
 Ride the Pink Horse (1947)
 Ride Ranger Ride (1936)
 Ride, Rise, Roar (2010)
 Ride, Tenderfoot, Ride (1940)
 Ride the Tiger (1970)
 Ride Tonight! (1942)
 Ride, Vaquero! (1953)
 Ride on Vaquero (1941)
 Ride of the Valkyrie (1967)
 Ride a Violent Mile (1957)
 Ride in the Whirlwind (1965)
 Ride a Wild Pony (1975)
 Ride the Wild Surf (1964)
 Ride for Your Life (1924)
 Rider on a Dead Horse (1962)
 Rider on the Rain (1970)
 Riders (2002)
 Riders of Justice (2020)
 Riders of the Purple Sage: (1918, 1925, 1931, 1941 & 1996 TV)
 Ridicule (1996)
 The Ridiculous 6 (2015)
 Riding Alone for Thousands of Miles (2005)
 Riding the Bullet (2004)
 Riding in Cars with Boys (2001)
 Riding Giants (2004)
 Riding in Vans with Boys (2003)

Rie–Rin

 Riel (1979)
 Rien que les heures (1926)
 Riff-Raff (1991)
 Riffraff: (1936 & 1947)
 Rififi (1955)
 Rififi in Amsterdam: (1962 & 1966)
 Rififi in Stockholm (1961)
 Rififi in Tokyo (1963)
 Rifkin's Festival (2020)
 Right America: Feeling Wronged – Some Voices from the Campaign Trail (2009)
 Right Bokka Left (2015)
 Right Cross (1950)
 Right Footed (2016)
 The Right Mistake (2015)
 Right Now (2004)
 Right Now, Wrong Then (2015)
 Right Right (2016)
 The Right Stuff (1983)
 The Right Temptation (2001)
 Right There (2013)
 The Right Way: (1921 & 2004)
 Right of Way (1983 TV) 
 Right at Your Door (2006)
 The Righteous (2021)
 Righteous Kill (2008)
 Righteous Ties (2006)
 Rihaee (1988)
 Riki-Oh: The Story of Ricky (1991)
 Riley the Cop (1928)
 Riley's First Date? (2015)
 Rim of the Canyon (1949)
 Rim of the World (2019)
 Rime of the Ancient Mariner (1975)
 Rimfire (1949)
 Rimini Rimini (1987)
 Rimini Rimini - Un anno dopo (1988)
 Rimsky-Korsakov (1953)
 Rinaldo Rinaldini (1927)
 Ring (1998)
 The Ring: (1927, 2002, & 2017)
 Ring 0: Birthday (2000)
 Ring 2 (1999)
 Ring of Bright Water (1969)
 Ring of Darkness (2004)
 A Ring of Endless Light (2002 TV)
 Ring Ring (2019)
 Ring of Steel (1942)
 The Ring Two (2005)
 Ring Up the Curtain (1919)
 The Ring Virus (1999)
 The Ringer: (1928, 1931, 1952, 2005 & 2013)
 Ringers: Lord of the Fans (2005)
 Ringmaster (1998)
 Rings: (2005 & 2017)
 The Rink (1916)

Rio–Rir

 Rio: (1939 & 2011)
 Rio 2 (2014)
 Rio, 100 Degrees F. (1955)
 Rio 2096: A Story of Love and Fury (2013)
 Rio Belongs to Us (2013)
 Rio Bravo (1959)
 Rio Conchos (1964)
 Rio Grande: (1920 & 1950)
 Rio Grande Patrol (1950)
 Rio Grande Raiders (1946)
 Rio, I Love You (2014)
 Rio Lobo (1970)
 Rio das Mortes (1971)
 Rio Rita: (1929 & 1942)
 Rio Sex Comedy (2010)
 Rio turbio (1952)
 Riot: (1969 & 1997)
 The Riot: (1913 & 2021)
 Riot in Cell Block 11 (1954)
 Riot in Juvenile Prison (1959)
 Riot on Redchurch Street (2012)
 Riot Squad: (1933 & 1941)
 Riot on Sunset Strip (1967)
 Rip Girls (2000 TV)
 Rip Roarin' Buckaroo (1936)
 Rip, Sew and Stitch (1953)
 Rip Tide (2017)
 Rip Van Winkle: (1903, 1910, 1912 & 1921)
 Rip's Dream (1905)
 Ripa Hits the Skids (1993)
 R.I.P.D. (2013)
 Ripe (1997)
 Ripley Under Ground (2005)
 Ripley's Game (2003)
 Ripped Off (1972)
 Ripper (2001)
 Ripper 2: Letter from Within (2004)
 Riptide (1934)
 Riptide a/k/a Ressac (2013)
 Le Rire (1953)

Ris

 Risas en Vacaciones (1990)
 Rise (2014)
 The Rise (2012)
 Rise: Blood Hunter (2007)
 The Rise of Catherine the Great (1934)
 The Rise and Fall of English Montreal (1993)
 The Rise and Fall of the Great Lakes (1968)
 The Rise and Fall of Legs Diamond (1960)
 The Rise and Fall of Squizzy Taylor (1969)
 The Rise and Fall of a White Collar Hooligan (2012)
 Rise of the Footsoldier (2008)
 Rise of the Gargoyles (2009 TV)
 Rise of the Guardians (2012)
 The Rise of Jennie Cushing (1917)
 The Rise of the Johnsons (1914)
 The Rise of the Krays (2015)
 Rise of the Legend (2014)
 Rise of the Lonestar Ranger (2014)
 Rise of the Planet of the Apes (2011)
 The Rise and Rise of Bitcoin (2014)
 The Rise and Rise of Michael Rimmer (1970)
 Rise and Shine (1941)
 The Rise of Susan (1916)
 Rise of the Teenage Mutant Ninja Turtles: The Movie (2022)
 The Rise of a Tomboy (2016)
 Rise Up (2007)
 Rise of the Zombie (2013)
 Rise of the Zombies (2012 TV)
 Risen: (2010 & 2016)
 Rishi: (2001 & 2005)
 Rishi Moolam (1980)
 Rishta hai pyar ka (1967)
 Rishta Kagaz Ka (1983)
 Rishta To Ho Aisa (1992)
 Rishte Naate (1965)
 Rishtey (2002)
 Rishyasringan (1997)
 Rishyasringar: (1941 & 1964)
 Rising from Ashes (2012)
 Rising to the Bait (1992)
 Rising Damp (1980)
 The Rising Generation (1928)
 The Rising Hawk (2019)
 Rising Moon (2005)
 The Rising of the Moon (1957)
 Rising Stars (2010)
 Rising Sun (1993)
 The Rising Tide (1949)
 Risk: (2001, 2007 & 2016)
 Risky Business: (1920, 1926, 1939 & 1983)
 Risto (2011)

Rit–Riz

 Rita: (1959, 2009 Indian & 2009 Italian)
 Rita the American Girl (1965)
 Rita of Cascia (1943)
 Rita Dove: An American Poet (2014)
 Rita Hayworth: The Love Goddess (1983 TV)
 Rita the Mosquito (1966)
 Rita, Sue and Bob Too (1987)
 Rita of the West (1967)
 The Rite: (1969 & 2011)
 Rite of Spring (1963)
 Rites of Passage: (1999 & 2012)
 Rites of Spring (2011)
 Rithubhedam (1987)
 Ritmo a todo color (1980)
 Ritmo, amor y juventud (1966)
 Ritmo, amor y picardía (1954)
 Ritmos del Caribe (1950)
 Ritoma (2018)
 Ritratto di borghesia in nero (1978)
 Ritratto di donna velata (1975)
 Ritu: (2009 & 2014)
 Ritual: (2002 & 2013)
 The Ritual: (2009 & 2017)
 Ritual of Evil (1970 TV)
 Ritual in Transfigured Time (1946)
 Rituals (1977)
 The Ritz (1976)
 Rivales (2008)
 The Rival (1956)
 Rivalry (1953)
 Rivals: (1923, 1925, 1972 & 2008)
 Rivals for the World Record (1930)
 Rive droite, rive gauche (1984)
 River: (2011, 2015 Canadian & 2015 Tibetan)
 The River: (1938, 1951 & 1984)
 River of Darkness (2011)
 River of Death (1989)
 River of Exploding Durians (2014)
 The River Fuefuki (1960)
 River of Fundament (2014)
 River of Gold: (1971 & 1998)
 River of Grass (1994)
 The River of Love (1960)
 A River Made to Drown In (1997)
 River of Mystery (1971 TV)
 River of No Return (1954)
 River Patrol (1948)
 River Road (2014)
 River of Romance (1929)
 River Runs Red (2018)
 A River Runs Through It (1992)
 River Street (1996)
 The River Wild (1994)
 River Without Buoys (1983)
 River's Edge (1986)
 River's End: (1930 & 1940)
 The River's End (1920)
 Riverbend (1989)
 Riverboat Rhythm (1946)
 Riverburn (2004)
 Riverhead (2016)
 Rivers of Babylon (1998)
 Rivers of Fire and Ice (1969)
 Rivers of Sand (1973)
 Rivers and Tides (2001)
 Riverworld (2003)
 Riyasat (2014)
 Rize (2005)

Ro

Roa

 Road (2002)
 The Road: (1955, 1964, 2001, 2009, 2011 & 2015)
 Road Agent: (1941 & 1952)
 Road to Alcatraz (1945)
 Road to Andalay (1964)
 The Road Back (1937)
 Road to Bali (1952)
 Road to the Big House (1947)
 Road to the Big Leagues (2007)
 Road to Dawn (2007)
 Road Demon (1938)
 The Road to El Dorado (2000)
 Road to Fame (2008)
 Road Games (2015)
 Road Gang (1936)
 The Road to Glory: (1926 & 1936)
 The Road to Guantánamo (2006)
 Road to Happiness (1942)
 Road Hard (2015)
 Road of Hell: (1931, 1946 & 1951)
 Road to Hell (2008)
 The Road Home: (1999 & 2003)
 The Road to Hong Kong (1962)
 Road House: (1928, 1934, 1948 & 1989)
 Road House 2 (2006)
 Road to Istanbul (2016)
 Road Kill: (1999 & 2010)
 Road to Life: (1931 & 1955)
 The Road to Mandalay: (1926 & 2016)
 Road to Morocco (1942)
 The Road to Mother (2016)
 Road Movie (2002)
 Road to Nhill (1997)
 Road to Ninja: Naruto the Movie (2012)
 Road No. 1 (2010)
 Road North (2012)
 Road to Nowhere (2010)
 Road to Paloma (2014)
 Road to Paradise (1930)
 Road to Paris (2001)
 Road to Perdition (2002)
 Road Rage (1999)
 Road to Redemption (2008)
 Road to the Reich (1945)
 Road to Rio: (1931 & 1947)
 Road to Rocío (1966)
 Road Romeo (2007)
 Road to Ruin (1991)
 The Road to Ruin: (1913, 1928 & 1934)
 Road Runner a Go-Go (1965)
 Road to Salina (1970)
 Road to Sangam (2009)
 Road Show (1941)
 Road to Singapore (1940)
 Road to the Stage (1963)
 Road to the Stars (1957)
 Road Trip (2000)
 Road Trip: Beer Pong (2009)
 Road to Utopia (1946)
 Road to Victory: (1941 & 1944)
 The Road to Wellville (1994)
 The Road Within (2014)
 Road to Yesterday (2015)
 Road to Zanzibar (1941)
 Road, Movie (2010)
 Roadblock (1951)
 Roadflower (1994)
 Roadgames (1981)
 Roadhouse 66 (1984)
 Roadhouse Nights (1930)
 Roadie: (1980 & 2011)
 Roadkill: (1989 & 2011)
 Roadracers: (1959 & 1994)
 Roadrunner: A Film About Anthony Bourdain (2021)
 Roads and Bridges (2000)
 Roads of Destiny (1921)
 Roads of Kiarostami (2005)
 Roads to Koktebel (2003)
 Roads to the South (1978)
 Roadside (2013)
 Roadside Ambanis (2011)
 Roadside Prophets (1992)
 Roadside Romeo (2008)
 Roald Dahl's Esio Trot (2015)
 Roam Sweet Home (1996)
 Roamin' Holiday (1937)
 Roamin' Wild (1936)
 Roaming (2013)
 Roaming Lady (1936)
 Roar: (1981 & 2014)
 Roar: Tigers of the Sundarbans (2014)
 Roar of the Crowd (1953)
 Roar of the Dragon (1932)
 Roar of the People (1941)
 Roar of the Press (1941)
 Roarin' Dan (1920)
 Roarin' Guns (1936)
 Roarin' Lead (1936)
 Roaring City (1951)
 Roaring Fire (1981)
 Roaring Lions at Home (1924)
 Roaring Rails (1924)
 Roaring Ranch (1930)
 Roaring Roads (1935)
 Roaring Timber (1937)
 The Roaring Twenties (1939)
 Roaring Wheels (2000)
 Roaring Years (1962)
 Roast Beef and Movies (1934)

Rob

 Rob the Mob (2014)
 Rob Roy: (1922 & 1995)
 Rob Roy, the Highland Rogue (1953)
 Rob-B-Hood (2006)
 Roba da ricchi (1987)
 The Robber (2010)
 The Robber Bride (1916)
 The Robber Kitten (1935)
 The Robber Symphony (1936)
 The Robbers (1962)
 Robbers of the Range (1941)
 Robbers' Roost: (1932 & 1955)
 Robbery: (1897, 1967 & 1985)
 The Robbery (1953)
 Robbery Alla Turca (2005)
 The Robbery of the Third Reich (2004)
 Robbery Under Arms: (1907 MacMahon, 1907 Tait, 1920, 1957 & 1985)
 Robbie (1979)
 Robbing Cleopatra's Tomb (1899)
 The Robe (1953)
 Robert the Bruce (2019)
 Roberta (1935)
 The Roberts Case (1933)
 Robin and the 7 Hoods (1964)
 Robin Hood: (1912, 1922, 1973, 1991, 2009, 2010 & 2018)
 Robin Hood Daffy (1958)
 Robin Hood: Men in Tights (1993)
 Robin Hood: Prince of Thieves (1991)
 Robin of Locksley (1996) (TV)
 Robin and Marian (1976)
 Robin's Wish (2020)
 Robinson Crusoe: (1902, 1927, 1947, 1954, 1974 TV, 1997 & 2016)
 Robinson Crusoe on Mars (1964)
 RoboCop series:
 RoboCop: (1987 & 2014)
 RoboCop 2 (1990)
 RoboCop 3 (1993)
 Robot (2010)
 Robot & Frank (2012)
 Robot Carnival (1987)
 Robot in the Family (1994)
 Robot Overlords (2014)
 Robot Stories (2003)
 The Robot vs. The Aztec Mummy (1958)
 Robots: (1988 & 2005)
 A Robust Romeo (1914)

Roc

 Rocco (2015)
 Rocco and His Brothers (1960)
 The Rochdale Pioneers (2012)
 The Rock (1996)
 Rock of Ages: (1918 & 2012)
 Rock Dog (2017)
 Rock the Kasbah (2015)
 Ro(c)k podvraťáků (2006)
 The Rock n' Roll Cops (2003)
 The Rock 'n' Roll Dreams of Duncan Christopher (2010)
 Rock 'n' Roll High School (1979)
 The Rock of Souls (1942)
 Rock Star: (2001, 2011 & 2015)
 The Rock Star and the Mullahs (2003)
 Rock-A-Bye Baby (1958)
 Rock-a-Doodle (1991)
 The Rocker (2008)
 The Rocket: (2005 & 2013)
 The Rocket from Calabuch (1956)
 The Rocket Man (1957)
 RocketMan (1997)
 Rocketman (2019)
 The Rocket Post (2004)
 Rocket Science (2007)
 The Rocketeer (1991)
 Rocketship X-M (1950)
 Rockin' in the Rockies (1945)
 The Rocking Horse Winner (1949)
 RocknRolla (2008)
 Rocko's Modern Life: Static Cling (2019)
 The Rocks of Valpre: (1919 & 1935)
 Rockula (1990)
 Rocky series:
 Rocky (1976)
 Rocky II (1979)
 Rocky III (1982)
 Rocky IV (1985)
 Rocky V (1990)
 Rocky Balboa (2006)
 The Rocky Horror Picture Show (1975)
 The Rocky Horror Picture Show: Let's Do the Time Warp Again (2016)
 Rocky Mountain Express (2011)
 The Rocky Road (1910)
 Roco Kingdom series:
 Roco Kingdom: The Desire of Dragon (2013)
 Roco Kingdom 3 (2014)
 Roco Kingdom 4 (2015)

Rod–Roi

 Rodan (1956)
 Rodeo (1952)
 Rodeo Dough (1931)
 Rodeo Girl (2016)
 Rodeo King and the Senorita (1951)
 Rodeo Rhythm (1942)
 Rodin (2017)
 Rodinné trampoty oficiála Tříšky (1949)
 Rodney Rude Live Volume 1 (1984)
 Rodor Sithi (2014)
 Rodora (1956)
 Roe v. Wade (2020)
 Roe vs. Wade (1989)
 Roesia si Pengkor (1939)
 Roger Corman's Operation Rogue (2014)
 Roger Dodger (2002)
 Roger la Honte: (1913, 1922, 1933 & 1946)
 Roger & Me (1989)
 Rogers Park (2017)
 Rogue: (2007 & 2017)
 The Rogue (1918)
 Rogue Agent (2022)
 Rogue Cop (1954)
 Rogue Male (1976 TV)
 Rogue One (2016)
 Rogue of the Range (1936)
 Rogue of the Rio Grande (1930)
 The Rogue Song (1930)
 Rogue Trader (1999)
 Rogue's Gallery (1968)
 Rogue's March (1953)
 The Rogues (1987)
 Rogues and Romance (1920)
 Rogues of Sherwood Forest (1950)
 Rogues of the Turf (1923)
 Rogues' Gallery (1944)
 Rogues' Regiment (1948)
 Roh (2019)
 Rohini (1953)
 Le Roi des Champs-Élysées (1934)
 Le Roi danse (2000)
 Le Roi Pandore (1950)
 Le Roi des resquilleurs (1930)

Roj–Rol

 Roja (1992)
 Roja Kootam (2002)
 Roja Malare (1997)
 Rojavai Killathe (1993)
 Rojavanam (1999)
 Rojavin Raja (1976)
 Rojo Amanecer (1990)
 Rojulu Marayi (1955)
 Rok 1863 (1922)
 Rok pierwszy (1960)
 Rok Sako To Rok Lo (2004)
 Rok spokojnego slonca (1984)
 Rokk í Reykjavík (1982)
 Rokkasho Rhapsody (2006)
 Rokunin no Ansatsusha (1955)
 Roland the Mighty (1956)
 The Role of Her Life (2004)
 Role Models: (2008 & 2017)
 Roll Along, Cowboy (1937)
 Roll Bounce (2005)
 Roll on Columbia: Woody Guthrie and the Columbia River Songs (2011)
 Roll, Freddy, Roll! (1974 TV)
 Roll Red Roll (2018)
 Roll Up Your Sleeves (2008)
 The Roller Blade Seven (1991)
 Roller Boogie (1979)
 Roller Derby Girl (1949)
 Roller Life (2016)
 Rollerball: (1975 & 2002)
 Rollercoaster: (1977 & 1999)
 Rolli: Amazing Tales (1991)
 Rollin' Home to Texas (1940)
 Rollin' with the Nines (2006)
 Rollin' Plains (1938)
 Rolling (2007)
 Rolling Caravans (1938)
 Rolling Down the Great Divide (1942)
 Rolling Home: (1926, 1935 & 1946)
 Rolling Kansas (2003)
 Rolling Love (2008)
 Rolling Man (1972 TV)
 Rolling Papers (2015)
 Rolling Stones (1916)
 The Rolling Stones Rock and Roll Circus (1996)
 Rolling Thunder (1977)
 Rolling Thunder Revue: A Bob Dylan Story by Martin Scorsese (2019)
 Rollo and the Spirit of the Woods (2001)
 Rollover (1981)
 Rolls – 28 (1951)

Rom

 Roma: (1972, 2004 & 2018)
 Roma come Chicago (1968)
 Roma, l'altra faccia della violenza (1976)
 Roman (2006)
 Roman Candles: (1920 & 1966)
 Roman Holiday: (1953, 1987 TV & 2017)
 Roman Polanski: A Film Memoir (2018)
 Roman Polanski: Wanted and Desired (2008)
 Roman Scandals (1933)
 The Roman Spring of Mrs. Stone (1961)
 Roman Tales (1955)
 Romance: (1920, 1930, 1936, 1983, 1986, 1999 & 2013)
 Romance and Arabella (1919)
 Romance of Astree and Celadon (2007)
 Romance for Bugle (1967)
 Romance of Celluloid (1937)
 Romance & Cigarettes (2006)
 Romance Complicated (2016)
 Romance in the Dark (1938)
 Romance de fieras (1954)
 Romance Joe (2011)
 Romance Land (1923)
 Romance in Manhattan (1935)
 Romance in Mekong River (1933)
 Romance in a Minor Key (1943)
 Romance Out of the Blue (2015)
 Romance in Puerto Rico (1962)
 Romance in the Rain (1934)
 Romance Ranch (1924)
 Romance in Rhythm (1934)
 A Romance of Seville (1929)
 Romance in Venice (1962)
 Romance of the Western Chamber (1927)
 Romancing the Stone (1984)
 The Romantic Englishwoman (1975)
 The Romantic President (2002)
 The Romantics (2010)
 Romanzo criminale (2005)
 Rome, Open City (1945)
 Romeo Is Bleeding (1993)
 Romeo and Juliet: (1900, 1908, 1916 Fox, 1916 Metro Pictures, 1936, 1940, 1953, 1954, 1955, 1968, 1996, 2006, 2013 & 2014)
 Romeo and Juliet in Sarajevo (1994)
 Romeo & Juliet: Sealed with a Kiss (2006)
 Romeo.Juliet (1990)
 Romeo Juliet (2015 & 2017)
 Romeo Must Die (2000)
 Romper Stomper (1992)
 Rómulo Resiste (2021)
 Romy and Michele's High School Reunion (1997)

Ron–Ror

 Ron's Gone Wrong (2021)
 Ronaldo (2015)
 Ronan's Escape (2010)
 La Ronde: (1950 & 1964)
 Rondo (1966)
 Ronia, the Robber's Daughter (1984)
 Ronin (1999)
 Rooftops (1989)
 Roohi: (1981 & 2021)
 The Rookie: (1959, 1990 & 2002)
 Rookie of the Year (1993)
 Rookies (1927)
 The Rookies (2019)
 Rookies in Burma (1943)
 Rookies on Parade (1941)
 Room: (2005 & 2015)
 The Room: (2003 & 2019)
 Room 6 (2006)
 Room 8 (2013)
 Room 10 (2006)
 Room 237 (2012)
 Room 304 (2011)
 Room 666 (1982)
 Room No. 103 (2015)
 Room No.7 (2017)
 Room and Bird (1951)
 Room and Board (1921)
 Room and a Half (2009)
 Room for Rent (2017)
 Room for Rent (2019)
 Room in Rome (2010)
 A Room for Romeo Brass (1999)
 Room at the Top: (1959 & 2012)
 A Room with a View: (1986 & 2007)
 Room: The Mystery (2014)
 The Roommate (2011)
 The Roost (2006)
 Rooster Cogburn (1975)
 The Root of Evil (1912)
 The Roots of Heaven (1958)
 Roots Search (1986)
 Rope (1948)
 Rory o' the Bogs (1913)
 Rory O'More (1911)

Ros–Rot

 Rosa (1986)
 Rosa de América (1946)
 Rosa and Cornelia (2000)
 Rosa de las nieves (1944)
 Rosa Luxemburg (1986)
 Rosa Morena (2010)
 Rosalba, la fanciulla di Pompei (1952)
 Rosalie (1937)
 Rosalinda (1945)
 Rosapoo (2018)
 Rosappu Ravikkaikari (1979)
 Rosario: (1935 & 2010)
 Rosario Tijeras (2005)
 Rosaura at 10 O'Clock (1958)
 Rose: (2011, 2012 & 2014)
 The Rose (1979)
 Rose of the Alley (1916)
 Rose by Any Other Name... (1997)
 Rose of the Asphalt Streets (1922)
 Rose Bernd: (1919 & 1957)
 Rose Bowl (1936)
 Rose of Cimarron (1952)
 Rose of the Golden West (1927)
 Rose Hobart (1936)
 Rose Hill (1997 TV)
 Rose Kennedy: A Life to Remember (1990)
 The Rose Maker (2020)
 Rose Marie: (1936 & 1954)
 Rose-Marie (1928)
 Rose of the Mountain (1952)
 Rose o' Paradise (1918)
 Rose Plays Julie (2019)
 Rose of the Rancho: (1914 & 1936)
 Rose of the Rio Grande (1938)
 Rose o' the River (1919)
 Rose o' the Sea (1922)
 Rose Rose I Love You (1993)
 The Rose Tattoo (1955)
 Rose of the Tenements (1926)
 Rose of Tralee: (1937 & 1942)
 Rose of Washington Square (1939)
 Rose of the Wilderness (1918)
 Rose of the World: (1918 & 1925)
 Rose of the Yukon (1949)
 Roseanna: (1967 & 1993)
 Rosebud: (1975 & 2019)
 Roseland (1977)
 Roselyne and the Lions (1989)
 Rosemary (1958)
 Rosemary Climbs the Heights (1918)
 Rosemary, That's for Remembrance (1914)
 Rosemary's Baby (1968)
 Rosemary's Daughter (1976)
 Rosencrantz & Guildenstern Are Dead (1990)
 Rosenmontag (1924)
 Rosenstrasse (2003)
 Rosenwald (2015)
 Roses à crédit (2010)
 Roses Are Red (1947)
 Roses Bloom on the Moorland: (1929 & 1952)
 Roses Bloom Twice (1978 TV)
 Roses of Picardy (1927)
 Roses for the Prosecutor (1959)
 Roses from the South: (1926 & 1954)
 Roses in Tyrol (1940)
 Rosetta (1999)
 Rosewater (2014)
 Rosewood (1997)
 Rosewood Lane (2011)
 Rosie: (1965, 1998, 2013 & 2018)
 Rosie! (1967)
 Rosie Dixon – Night Nurse (1978)
 Rosie the Riveter (1944)
 Rosies of the North (1999)
 Rosita (1923)
 Rosogolla (2018)
 Rosolino Paternò, soldato... (1970)
 Rossana (1953)
 Rossini (1942)
 Rossini! Rossini! (1991)
 Rossini's Ghost (1996)
 Roswell (1994 TV)
 Roswell: The Aliens Attack (1999 TV)
 Rosy (2018)
 Rosy Dreams (1977)
 Rotation (1949)
 Roti: (1942, 1974 & 1988)
 Roti Kapda Aur Makaan (1974)
 Roti Ki Keemat (1990)
 Rotkäppchen (1962)
 Rötmånad (1970)
 Rotten to the Core (1965)
 Rottentail (2019)
 Rottweiler (2005)

Rou

 Rouge (1988)
 Rouge and Riches (1920)
 Rough (2014)
 Rough Aunties (2008)
 Rough But Respectable (1949)
 Rough Cut: (1980 & 2008)
 Rough Diamonds (1994)
 Rough Going (1925)
 The Rough House (1917)
 Rough House Rosie (1927)
 Rough Justice (1970)
 Rough Magic (1995)
 Rough Night (2017)
 Rough Night in Jericho (1967)
 Rough Play (2013)
 Rough and Ready (1918)
 Rough Rider (2014)
 Rough Riders (1997)
 Rough Riders of Cheyenne (1945)
 Rough Riders of Durango (1951)
 Rough Riding Ranger (1935)
 Rough Riding Romance (1919)
 Rough Romance (1930)
 Rough Sea at Dover (1895)
 Rough Shoot (1953)
 Rough Stuff (1925)
 Rough, Tough and Ready (1945)
 Rough Waters (1930)
 Roughly Speaking (1945)
 Roughshod: (1922 & 1949)
 Roujin Z (1991)
 Roulette: (1924 & 2011)
 Round Eyes in the Middle Kingdom (1995)
 Round Midnight (1986)
 Round Trip to Mars (1957)
 The Round Up: (1941 & 2010)
 The Round-Up: (1920 & 1966)
 Round-Up Time in Texas (1937)
 Rounders (1998)
 The Rounders: (1914 & 1965)
 Roundhay Garden Scene (1888)
 Rounding Up the Law (1922)
 Roundtrip (2004)
 The Roundup (2022)
 Roustabout (1964)

Rov–Roz

 The Rover: (1967 & 2014)
 Rover Dangerfield: The Dog Who Gets No Respect (1991)
 Rover's Big Chance (1942)
 Rovin' Tumbleweeds (1939)
 Roving Mars (2006)
 Row Your Boat (1998)
 Rowdy: (1966 & 2014)
 Rowdy Aliya (2004)
 Rowdy Alludu (1991)
 Rowdy Fellow (2014)
 Rowdy Gaari Pellam (1991)
 Rowdy Inspector (1992)
 Rowdy & MLA (1991)
 Rowdy Ramu (1978)
 Rowdy Ramudu Konte Krishnudu (1980)
 Rowdy Ranganna (1968)
 Rowdy Rathore (2012)
 The Rowdyman (1972)
 Rowing Across the Atlantic (1978)
 Rowing with the Wind (1988)
 Roxanne (1987)
 Roxanne Roxanne (2018)
 Roxie Hart (1942)
 Roxy Hunter series:
 Roxy Hunter and the Mystery of the Moody Ghost (2007)
 Roxy Hunter and the Secret of the Shaman (2008)
 Roxy Hunter and the Myth of the Mermaid (2008)
 Roxy Hunter and the Horrific Halloween (2008)
 Roxy and the Wonderteam (1938)
 Roy: (2015 & 2021)
 Roy Colt & Winchester Jack (1970)
 A Royal Affair (2012)
 Royal Bengal Rahashya (2011)
 Royal Blood (1916)
 Royal Cat Nap (1958)
 Royal Cavalcade (1935)
 Royal Children (1950)
 Royal Eagle (1936)
 Royal Family (1969 TV)
 The Royal Family of Broadway (1930)
 Royal Flash (1975)
 Royal Hearts (2018)
 Royal Journey (1951)
 Royal Kill (2009)
 Royal Paintbox (2013)
 Royal River (1959)
 A Royal Romance: (1917 & 1930)
 A Royal Scandal: (1945 & 1996)
 The Royal Scandal (2001)
 Royal Space Force: The Wings of Honnêamise (1987)
 The Royal Tenenbaums (2001)
 Royal Tramp (1992)
 Royal Tramp II (1992)
 Royal Treasure (2016)
 Royal Waltz (1936)
 Royal Wedding (1951)
 Royce (1994)
 Rozina, the Love Child (1945)

Ru–Rz

 Ruang Talok 69 (1999)
 Rubber: (1936 & 2010)
 Rubber's Lover (1996)
 Ruby in Paradise (1993)
 Ruby Sparks (2012)
 Rudo y Cursi (2009)
 Rudolf the Black Cat (2016)
 Rudolph the Red-Nosed Reindeer: (1948 & 1964 TV)
 Rudolph the Red-Nosed Reindeer and the Island of Misfit Toys (2001)
 Rudolph the Red-Nosed Reindeer: The Movie (1998)
 Rudy (1993)
 Rudyard Kipling's Jungle Book (1942)
 Ruggles of Red Gap (1935)
 Rugrats Go Wild (2003)
 The Rugrats Movie (1998)
 Rugrats in Paris: The Movie (2000)
 The Ruins (2008)
 Rules Don’t Apply (2016)
 The Rules of Attraction (2002)
 Rules of Dating (2005)
 Rules of Engagement (2000)
 The Rules of the Game (1939)
 The Ruling Class (1972)
 The Rum Diary (2011)
 Rumble: (2002, 2016 & 2021)
 Rumble in the Bronx (1996)
 Rumble Fish (1983)
 Rumor Has It (2005)
 Rumpelstiltskin: (1940, 1955, 1985 TV, 1987 & 1995)
 Run: (1991, 2002, 2004, 2014, 2016, 2019, 2020 American & 2020 Indian)
 Run Boy Run (2013)
 Run Fatboy Run (2007)
 Run Hide Fight (2020)
 Run Lola Run (1998)
 Run Ronnie Run (2003)
 Run Silent, Run Deep (1958)
 Run This Town (2019)
 Run, Man, Run (1968)
 Runaway: (1984, 2001 & 2005)
 Runaway Bride (1999)
 Runaway Jury (2003)
 Runaway Train (1985)
 Runaway! (1973) (TV)
 The Runaways (2010)
 The Rundown (2003)
 The Runner: (1985, 1999 & 2015)
 Runner Runner (2013)
 The Runner Stumbles (1979)
 Running the Bases (2022)
 Running on Empty: (1982, 1988 & 2006)
 The Running Jumping & Standing Still Film (1960)
 Running on Karma (2003)
 The Running Man: (1963 & 1987)
 Running Man: (2013 & 2015)
 Running Out of Time: (1994 & 1999)
 Running Scared: (1972, 1980, 1986, & 2006)
 Running with Scissors (2006)
 Running Time (1997)
 Running Wild: (1992 & 2006)
 Runt (2020)
 Rurouni Kenshin series:
 Rurouni Kenshin (2012)
 Rurouni Kenshin: The Beginning (2021)
 Rurouni Kenshin: The Final (2021)
 Rurouni Kenshin: Kyoto Inferno (2014)
 Rurouni Kenshin: The Legend Ends (2014)
 Rush: (1991 & 2013) 
 Rush Hour series:
 Rush Hour (1998)
 Rush Hour 2 (2001)
 Rush Hour 3 (2007)
 Rush in Rio (2003)
 Rush Week (1989)
 Rushmore (1998)
 Ruslan and Ludmila (1972)
 Russian Ark (2002)
 Russian Dolls (2005)
 The Russian House (1990)
 The Russians Are Coming, the Russians Are Coming (1966)
 Rust: (2010, 2018 & TBA)
 Rust and Bone (2012)
 Rustlers: (1919 & 1949)
 Rustlers of Devil's Canyon (1947)
 Rustlers of Red Dog (1935)
 Rustlers' Hideout (1944)
 Rustlers' Rhapsody (1985)
 Rustlers' Roundup (1933)
 Ruthless (1948)
 The Ruthless (2019)
 Ruthless People (1986)
 Rx (2005)
 Rx Murder (1958)
 RX 100 (2018)
 Ryan (2004)
 The Ryan White Story (1989) (TV)
 Ryan's Daughter (1970)
 Ryba na suchu (1942)
 Rybka (2007)
 Ryujin Mabuyer the Movie: Nanatsu no Mabui (2012)
 Ryuzo and The Seven Henchmen (2015)
 Rzeczywistość (1961)

Previous:  List of films: P    Next:  List of films: S

See also
 Lists of films
 Lists of actors
 List of film and television directors
 List of documentary films
 List of film production companies

-